

456001–456100 

|-bgcolor=#fefefe
| 456001 ||  || — || November 22, 2005 || Kitt Peak || Spacewatch || — || align=right data-sort-value="0.67" | 670 m || 
|-id=002 bgcolor=#fefefe
| 456002 ||  || — || December 4, 2005 || Kitt Peak || Spacewatch || — || align=right data-sort-value="0.64" | 640 m || 
|-id=003 bgcolor=#d6d6d6
| 456003 ||  || — || December 4, 2005 || Kitt Peak || Spacewatch || — || align=right | 1.8 km || 
|-id=004 bgcolor=#d6d6d6
| 456004 ||  || — || December 24, 2005 || Kitt Peak || Spacewatch || EOS || align=right | 1.9 km || 
|-id=005 bgcolor=#d6d6d6
| 456005 ||  || — || December 24, 2005 || Kitt Peak || Spacewatch || — || align=right | 1.7 km || 
|-id=006 bgcolor=#fefefe
| 456006 ||  || — || December 24, 2005 || Kitt Peak || Spacewatch || H || align=right data-sort-value="0.86" | 860 m || 
|-id=007 bgcolor=#d6d6d6
| 456007 ||  || — || December 25, 2005 || Kitt Peak || Spacewatch || — || align=right | 1.5 km || 
|-id=008 bgcolor=#d6d6d6
| 456008 ||  || — || November 26, 2005 || Mount Lemmon || Mount Lemmon Survey || — || align=right | 2.3 km || 
|-id=009 bgcolor=#d6d6d6
| 456009 ||  || — || December 1, 2005 || Mount Lemmon || Mount Lemmon Survey || — || align=right | 2.2 km || 
|-id=010 bgcolor=#d6d6d6
| 456010 ||  || — || December 24, 2005 || Kitt Peak || Spacewatch || EOS || align=right | 1.4 km || 
|-id=011 bgcolor=#d6d6d6
| 456011 ||  || — || December 25, 2005 || Kitt Peak || Spacewatch || — || align=right | 2.0 km || 
|-id=012 bgcolor=#fefefe
| 456012 ||  || — || December 26, 2005 || Kitt Peak || Spacewatch || — || align=right data-sort-value="0.54" | 540 m || 
|-id=013 bgcolor=#d6d6d6
| 456013 ||  || — || December 26, 2005 || Kitt Peak || Spacewatch || — || align=right | 1.9 km || 
|-id=014 bgcolor=#d6d6d6
| 456014 ||  || — || December 26, 2005 || Kitt Peak || Spacewatch || — || align=right | 1.6 km || 
|-id=015 bgcolor=#d6d6d6
| 456015 ||  || — || December 8, 2005 || Kitt Peak || Spacewatch || EOS || align=right | 1.9 km || 
|-id=016 bgcolor=#d6d6d6
| 456016 ||  || — || December 24, 2005 || Kitt Peak || Spacewatch || — || align=right | 2.5 km || 
|-id=017 bgcolor=#d6d6d6
| 456017 ||  || — || December 24, 2005 || Kitt Peak || Spacewatch || 615 || align=right | 1.3 km || 
|-id=018 bgcolor=#d6d6d6
| 456018 ||  || — || November 25, 2005 || Mount Lemmon || Mount Lemmon Survey || EOS || align=right | 1.8 km || 
|-id=019 bgcolor=#fefefe
| 456019 ||  || — || December 24, 2005 || Kitt Peak || Spacewatch || — || align=right data-sort-value="0.71" | 710 m || 
|-id=020 bgcolor=#d6d6d6
| 456020 ||  || — || December 24, 2005 || Kitt Peak || Spacewatch || EOS || align=right | 1.9 km || 
|-id=021 bgcolor=#fefefe
| 456021 ||  || — || December 25, 2005 || Kitt Peak || Spacewatch || — || align=right data-sort-value="0.59" | 590 m || 
|-id=022 bgcolor=#fefefe
| 456022 ||  || — || December 25, 2005 || Mount Lemmon || Mount Lemmon Survey || — || align=right data-sort-value="0.69" | 690 m || 
|-id=023 bgcolor=#fefefe
| 456023 ||  || — || December 25, 2005 || Mount Lemmon || Mount Lemmon Survey || — || align=right data-sort-value="0.78" | 780 m || 
|-id=024 bgcolor=#FA8072
| 456024 ||  || — || December 26, 2005 || Kitt Peak || Spacewatch || — || align=right data-sort-value="0.89" | 890 m || 
|-id=025 bgcolor=#FA8072
| 456025 ||  || — || November 30, 2005 || Socorro || LINEAR || — || align=right data-sort-value="0.92" | 920 m || 
|-id=026 bgcolor=#fefefe
| 456026 ||  || — || December 25, 2005 || Kitt Peak || Spacewatch || — || align=right data-sort-value="0.69" | 690 m || 
|-id=027 bgcolor=#d6d6d6
| 456027 ||  || — || December 2, 2005 || Mount Lemmon || Mount Lemmon Survey || — || align=right | 2.0 km || 
|-id=028 bgcolor=#d6d6d6
| 456028 ||  || — || December 2, 2005 || Mount Lemmon || Mount Lemmon Survey || — || align=right | 3.0 km || 
|-id=029 bgcolor=#fefefe
| 456029 ||  || — || December 25, 2005 || Kitt Peak || Spacewatch || — || align=right data-sort-value="0.66" | 660 m || 
|-id=030 bgcolor=#d6d6d6
| 456030 ||  || — || December 25, 2005 || Kitt Peak || Spacewatch || — || align=right | 2.8 km || 
|-id=031 bgcolor=#d6d6d6
| 456031 ||  || — || December 25, 2005 || Kitt Peak || Spacewatch || — || align=right | 3.0 km || 
|-id=032 bgcolor=#fefefe
| 456032 ||  || — || December 25, 2005 || Kitt Peak || Spacewatch || — || align=right data-sort-value="0.57" | 570 m || 
|-id=033 bgcolor=#fefefe
| 456033 ||  || — || December 25, 2005 || Kitt Peak || Spacewatch || — || align=right data-sort-value="0.63" | 630 m || 
|-id=034 bgcolor=#d6d6d6
| 456034 ||  || — || December 25, 2005 || Mount Lemmon || Mount Lemmon Survey || — || align=right | 1.7 km || 
|-id=035 bgcolor=#d6d6d6
| 456035 ||  || — || December 1, 2005 || Mount Lemmon || Mount Lemmon Survey || — || align=right | 2.4 km || 
|-id=036 bgcolor=#d6d6d6
| 456036 ||  || — || December 29, 2005 || Kitt Peak || Spacewatch || — || align=right | 2.2 km || 
|-id=037 bgcolor=#fefefe
| 456037 ||  || — || December 27, 2005 || Kitt Peak || Spacewatch || — || align=right data-sort-value="0.91" | 910 m || 
|-id=038 bgcolor=#E9E9E9
| 456038 ||  || — || December 21, 2005 || Kitt Peak || Spacewatch || — || align=right | 2.7 km || 
|-id=039 bgcolor=#d6d6d6
| 456039 ||  || — || December 1, 2005 || Mount Lemmon || Mount Lemmon Survey || — || align=right | 2.9 km || 
|-id=040 bgcolor=#E9E9E9
| 456040 ||  || — || December 22, 2005 || Kitt Peak || Spacewatch || — || align=right | 2.2 km || 
|-id=041 bgcolor=#fefefe
| 456041 ||  || — || December 27, 2005 || Kitt Peak || Spacewatch || — || align=right | 1.0 km || 
|-id=042 bgcolor=#E9E9E9
| 456042 ||  || — || December 26, 2005 || Kitt Peak || Spacewatch || — || align=right | 2.7 km || 
|-id=043 bgcolor=#d6d6d6
| 456043 ||  || — || December 26, 2005 || Mount Lemmon || Mount Lemmon Survey || — || align=right | 2.7 km || 
|-id=044 bgcolor=#d6d6d6
| 456044 ||  || — || November 6, 2005 || Mount Lemmon || Mount Lemmon Survey || — || align=right | 2.5 km || 
|-id=045 bgcolor=#d6d6d6
| 456045 ||  || — || December 24, 2005 || Kitt Peak || Spacewatch || — || align=right | 2.5 km || 
|-id=046 bgcolor=#d6d6d6
| 456046 ||  || — || December 29, 2005 || Mount Lemmon || Mount Lemmon Survey || — || align=right | 2.4 km || 
|-id=047 bgcolor=#d6d6d6
| 456047 ||  || — || December 29, 2005 || Kitt Peak || Spacewatch || — || align=right | 2.2 km || 
|-id=048 bgcolor=#fefefe
| 456048 ||  || — || December 25, 2005 || Kitt Peak || Spacewatch || — || align=right data-sort-value="0.48" | 480 m || 
|-id=049 bgcolor=#d6d6d6
| 456049 ||  || — || December 27, 2005 || Kitt Peak || Spacewatch || — || align=right | 1.9 km || 
|-id=050 bgcolor=#d6d6d6
| 456050 ||  || — || December 25, 2005 || Mount Lemmon || Mount Lemmon Survey || — || align=right | 2.1 km || 
|-id=051 bgcolor=#FFC2E0
| 456051 || 2006 AW || — || January 5, 2006 || Catalina || CSS || APOcritical || align=right data-sort-value="0.62" | 620 m || 
|-id=052 bgcolor=#d6d6d6
| 456052 ||  || — || December 6, 2005 || Mount Lemmon || Mount Lemmon Survey || EOS || align=right | 2.1 km || 
|-id=053 bgcolor=#fefefe
| 456053 ||  || — || January 4, 2006 || Kitt Peak || Spacewatch || — || align=right data-sort-value="0.89" | 890 m || 
|-id=054 bgcolor=#E9E9E9
| 456054 ||  || — || January 4, 2006 || Catalina || CSS || — || align=right | 3.0 km || 
|-id=055 bgcolor=#fefefe
| 456055 ||  || — || January 2, 2006 || Mount Lemmon || Mount Lemmon Survey || — || align=right data-sort-value="0.60" | 600 m || 
|-id=056 bgcolor=#d6d6d6
| 456056 ||  || — || December 22, 2005 || Kitt Peak || Spacewatch || EOS || align=right | 1.8 km || 
|-id=057 bgcolor=#fefefe
| 456057 ||  || — || January 4, 2006 || Kitt Peak || Spacewatch || — || align=right data-sort-value="0.64" | 640 m || 
|-id=058 bgcolor=#d6d6d6
| 456058 ||  || — || January 5, 2006 || Mount Lemmon || Mount Lemmon Survey || — || align=right | 2.0 km || 
|-id=059 bgcolor=#d6d6d6
| 456059 ||  || — || December 25, 2005 || Mount Lemmon || Mount Lemmon Survey || KOR || align=right | 1.3 km || 
|-id=060 bgcolor=#d6d6d6
| 456060 ||  || — || December 25, 2005 || Kitt Peak || Spacewatch || BRA || align=right | 1.6 km || 
|-id=061 bgcolor=#d6d6d6
| 456061 ||  || — || January 5, 2006 || Kitt Peak || Spacewatch || BRA || align=right | 1.5 km || 
|-id=062 bgcolor=#fefefe
| 456062 ||  || — || November 30, 2005 || Mount Lemmon || Mount Lemmon Survey || — || align=right data-sort-value="0.60" | 600 m || 
|-id=063 bgcolor=#d6d6d6
| 456063 ||  || — || January 5, 2006 || Kitt Peak || Spacewatch || — || align=right | 1.9 km || 
|-id=064 bgcolor=#d6d6d6
| 456064 ||  || — || December 28, 2005 || Kitt Peak || Spacewatch || — || align=right | 2.7 km || 
|-id=065 bgcolor=#d6d6d6
| 456065 ||  || — || December 4, 2005 || Mount Lemmon || Mount Lemmon Survey || — || align=right | 2.0 km || 
|-id=066 bgcolor=#fefefe
| 456066 ||  || — || January 8, 2006 || Kitt Peak || Spacewatch || — || align=right data-sort-value="0.66" | 660 m || 
|-id=067 bgcolor=#fefefe
| 456067 ||  || — || January 6, 2006 || Kitt Peak || Spacewatch || — || align=right data-sort-value="0.53" | 530 m || 
|-id=068 bgcolor=#d6d6d6
| 456068 ||  || — || January 7, 2006 || Socorro || LINEAR || — || align=right | 3.8 km || 
|-id=069 bgcolor=#d6d6d6
| 456069 ||  || — || January 6, 2006 || Mount Lemmon || Mount Lemmon Survey || — || align=right | 2.3 km || 
|-id=070 bgcolor=#fefefe
| 456070 ||  || — || January 7, 2006 || Kitt Peak || Spacewatch || — || align=right data-sort-value="0.56" | 560 m || 
|-id=071 bgcolor=#d6d6d6
| 456071 ||  || — || January 10, 2006 || Mount Lemmon || Mount Lemmon Survey || — || align=right | 2.3 km || 
|-id=072 bgcolor=#fefefe
| 456072 ||  || — || December 6, 2005 || Mount Lemmon || Mount Lemmon Survey || — || align=right data-sort-value="0.68" | 680 m || 
|-id=073 bgcolor=#d6d6d6
| 456073 ||  || — || October 28, 2005 || Mount Lemmon || Mount Lemmon Survey || — || align=right | 3.1 km || 
|-id=074 bgcolor=#d6d6d6
| 456074 ||  || — || January 6, 2006 || Mount Lemmon || Mount Lemmon Survey || BRA || align=right | 1.3 km || 
|-id=075 bgcolor=#fefefe
| 456075 ||  || — || January 8, 2006 || Kitt Peak || Spacewatch || — || align=right data-sort-value="0.61" | 610 m || 
|-id=076 bgcolor=#E9E9E9
| 456076 ||  || — || January 23, 2006 || Kitt Peak || Spacewatch || — || align=right | 2.1 km || 
|-id=077 bgcolor=#fefefe
| 456077 ||  || — || January 24, 2006 || Kitt Peak || Spacewatch || — || align=right data-sort-value="0.84" | 840 m || 
|-id=078 bgcolor=#d6d6d6
| 456078 ||  || — || January 23, 2006 || Mount Lemmon || Mount Lemmon Survey || BRA || align=right | 1.7 km || 
|-id=079 bgcolor=#C2FFFF
| 456079 ||  || — || November 12, 2005 || Kitt Peak || Spacewatch || L5 || align=right | 8.3 km || 
|-id=080 bgcolor=#fefefe
| 456080 ||  || — || January 23, 2006 || Kitt Peak || Spacewatch || — || align=right data-sort-value="0.63" | 630 m || 
|-id=081 bgcolor=#d6d6d6
| 456081 ||  || — || January 23, 2006 || Kitt Peak || Spacewatch || — || align=right | 2.1 km || 
|-id=082 bgcolor=#fefefe
| 456082 ||  || — || January 23, 2006 || Kitt Peak || Spacewatch || — || align=right data-sort-value="0.50" | 500 m || 
|-id=083 bgcolor=#d6d6d6
| 456083 ||  || — || January 23, 2006 || Kitt Peak || Spacewatch || — || align=right | 3.4 km || 
|-id=084 bgcolor=#d6d6d6
| 456084 ||  || — || January 25, 2006 || Kitt Peak || Spacewatch || — || align=right | 2.4 km || 
|-id=085 bgcolor=#d6d6d6
| 456085 ||  || — || January 25, 2006 || Kitt Peak || Spacewatch || THM || align=right | 2.1 km || 
|-id=086 bgcolor=#d6d6d6
| 456086 ||  || — || January 25, 2006 || Kitt Peak || Spacewatch || — || align=right | 2.8 km || 
|-id=087 bgcolor=#fefefe
| 456087 ||  || — || January 7, 2006 || Mount Lemmon || Mount Lemmon Survey || — || align=right data-sort-value="0.53" | 530 m || 
|-id=088 bgcolor=#d6d6d6
| 456088 ||  || — || January 5, 2006 || Mount Lemmon || Mount Lemmon Survey || — || align=right | 1.6 km || 
|-id=089 bgcolor=#fefefe
| 456089 ||  || — || January 25, 2006 || Kitt Peak || Spacewatch || — || align=right data-sort-value="0.88" | 880 m || 
|-id=090 bgcolor=#fefefe
| 456090 ||  || — || January 26, 2006 || Kitt Peak || Spacewatch || — || align=right data-sort-value="0.55" | 550 m || 
|-id=091 bgcolor=#fefefe
| 456091 ||  || — || January 26, 2006 || Kitt Peak || Spacewatch || — || align=right data-sort-value="0.98" | 980 m || 
|-id=092 bgcolor=#fefefe
| 456092 ||  || — || January 5, 2006 || Mount Lemmon || Mount Lemmon Survey || — || align=right data-sort-value="0.89" | 890 m || 
|-id=093 bgcolor=#d6d6d6
| 456093 ||  || — || January 25, 2006 || Kitt Peak || Spacewatch || — || align=right | 1.9 km || 
|-id=094 bgcolor=#C2FFFF
| 456094 ||  || — || January 26, 2006 || Mount Lemmon || Mount Lemmon Survey || L5 || align=right | 11 km || 
|-id=095 bgcolor=#d6d6d6
| 456095 ||  || — || January 26, 2006 || Mount Lemmon || Mount Lemmon Survey || — || align=right | 3.2 km || 
|-id=096 bgcolor=#fefefe
| 456096 ||  || — || January 27, 2006 || Kitt Peak || Spacewatch || — || align=right data-sort-value="0.52" | 520 m || 
|-id=097 bgcolor=#fefefe
| 456097 ||  || — || January 27, 2006 || Mount Lemmon || Mount Lemmon Survey || V || align=right data-sort-value="0.63" | 630 m || 
|-id=098 bgcolor=#fefefe
| 456098 ||  || — || January 30, 2006 || Kitt Peak || Spacewatch || — || align=right data-sort-value="0.55" | 550 m || 
|-id=099 bgcolor=#d6d6d6
| 456099 ||  || — || January 23, 2006 || Catalina || CSS || — || align=right | 2.9 km || 
|-id=100 bgcolor=#fefefe
| 456100 ||  || — || January 30, 2006 || Kitt Peak || Spacewatch || — || align=right data-sort-value="0.62" | 620 m || 
|}

456101–456200 

|-bgcolor=#fefefe
| 456101 ||  || — || January 30, 2006 || Kitt Peak || Spacewatch || — || align=right data-sort-value="0.59" | 590 m || 
|-id=102 bgcolor=#d6d6d6
| 456102 ||  || — || January 7, 2006 || Mount Lemmon || Mount Lemmon Survey || — || align=right | 2.6 km || 
|-id=103 bgcolor=#fefefe
| 456103 ||  || — || January 30, 2006 || Kitt Peak || Spacewatch || H || align=right data-sort-value="0.62" | 620 m || 
|-id=104 bgcolor=#d6d6d6
| 456104 ||  || — || January 23, 2006 || Kitt Peak || Spacewatch || EOS || align=right | 1.9 km || 
|-id=105 bgcolor=#d6d6d6
| 456105 ||  || — || January 23, 2006 || Kitt Peak || Spacewatch || — || align=right | 2.7 km || 
|-id=106 bgcolor=#d6d6d6
| 456106 ||  || — || January 31, 2006 || Kitt Peak || Spacewatch || — || align=right | 3.7 km || 
|-id=107 bgcolor=#d6d6d6
| 456107 ||  || — || January 31, 2006 || Kitt Peak || Spacewatch || — || align=right | 2.0 km || 
|-id=108 bgcolor=#fefefe
| 456108 ||  || — || January 23, 2006 || Mount Lemmon || Mount Lemmon Survey || — || align=right data-sort-value="0.55" | 550 m || 
|-id=109 bgcolor=#d6d6d6
| 456109 ||  || — || January 30, 2006 || Kitt Peak || Spacewatch || KOR || align=right | 1.4 km || 
|-id=110 bgcolor=#C2FFFF
| 456110 ||  || — || January 31, 2006 || Kitt Peak || Spacewatch || L5 || align=right | 7.5 km || 
|-id=111 bgcolor=#d6d6d6
| 456111 ||  || — || January 23, 2006 || Mount Lemmon || Mount Lemmon Survey || KOR || align=right data-sort-value="0.99" | 990 m || 
|-id=112 bgcolor=#fefefe
| 456112 ||  || — || February 1, 2006 || Mount Lemmon || Mount Lemmon Survey || — || align=right data-sort-value="0.51" | 510 m || 
|-id=113 bgcolor=#fefefe
| 456113 ||  || — || February 2, 2006 || Kitt Peak || Spacewatch || — || align=right data-sort-value="0.64" | 640 m || 
|-id=114 bgcolor=#d6d6d6
| 456114 ||  || — || December 25, 2005 || Kitt Peak || Spacewatch || — || align=right | 2.3 km || 
|-id=115 bgcolor=#fefefe
| 456115 ||  || — || January 20, 2006 || Kitt Peak || Spacewatch || — || align=right data-sort-value="0.82" | 820 m || 
|-id=116 bgcolor=#fefefe
| 456116 ||  || — || February 4, 2006 || Mount Lemmon || Mount Lemmon Survey || — || align=right data-sort-value="0.58" | 580 m || 
|-id=117 bgcolor=#C2FFFF
| 456117 ||  || — || February 4, 2006 || Mount Lemmon || Mount Lemmon Survey || L5 || align=right | 13 km || 
|-id=118 bgcolor=#d6d6d6
| 456118 ||  || — || January 26, 2006 || Mount Lemmon || Mount Lemmon Survey || — || align=right | 2.3 km || 
|-id=119 bgcolor=#fefefe
| 456119 ||  || — || January 25, 2006 || Kitt Peak || Spacewatch || — || align=right data-sort-value="0.50" | 500 m || 
|-id=120 bgcolor=#C2FFFF
| 456120 ||  || — || February 20, 2006 || Kitt Peak || Spacewatch || L5 || align=right | 6.6 km || 
|-id=121 bgcolor=#fefefe
| 456121 ||  || — || February 20, 2006 || Kitt Peak || Spacewatch || — || align=right data-sort-value="0.61" | 610 m || 
|-id=122 bgcolor=#d6d6d6
| 456122 ||  || — || February 24, 2006 || Kitt Peak || Spacewatch || — || align=right | 2.4 km || 
|-id=123 bgcolor=#d6d6d6
| 456123 ||  || — || February 24, 2006 || Kitt Peak || Spacewatch || — || align=right | 2.6 km || 
|-id=124 bgcolor=#d6d6d6
| 456124 ||  || — || February 24, 2006 || Kitt Peak || Spacewatch || — || align=right | 2.5 km || 
|-id=125 bgcolor=#d6d6d6
| 456125 ||  || — || February 24, 2006 || Kitt Peak || Spacewatch || — || align=right | 2.5 km || 
|-id=126 bgcolor=#d6d6d6
| 456126 ||  || — || February 24, 2006 || Kitt Peak || Spacewatch || — || align=right | 2.3 km || 
|-id=127 bgcolor=#d6d6d6
| 456127 ||  || — || February 24, 2006 || Kitt Peak || Spacewatch || — || align=right | 1.8 km || 
|-id=128 bgcolor=#fefefe
| 456128 ||  || — || February 25, 2006 || Kitt Peak || Spacewatch || — || align=right data-sort-value="0.61" | 610 m || 
|-id=129 bgcolor=#d6d6d6
| 456129 ||  || — || February 25, 2006 || Kitt Peak || Spacewatch || — || align=right | 2.2 km || 
|-id=130 bgcolor=#d6d6d6
| 456130 ||  || — || January 26, 2006 || Kitt Peak || Spacewatch || — || align=right | 2.1 km || 
|-id=131 bgcolor=#d6d6d6
| 456131 ||  || — || February 25, 2006 || Mount Lemmon || Mount Lemmon Survey || EOS || align=right | 2.1 km || 
|-id=132 bgcolor=#d6d6d6
| 456132 ||  || — || February 25, 2006 || Mount Lemmon || Mount Lemmon Survey || — || align=right | 2.3 km || 
|-id=133 bgcolor=#d6d6d6
| 456133 ||  || — || February 25, 2006 || Kitt Peak || Spacewatch || — || align=right | 2.3 km || 
|-id=134 bgcolor=#d6d6d6
| 456134 ||  || — || February 25, 2006 || Kitt Peak || Spacewatch || — || align=right | 2.2 km || 
|-id=135 bgcolor=#d6d6d6
| 456135 ||  || — || February 25, 2006 || Kitt Peak || Spacewatch || — || align=right | 2.3 km || 
|-id=136 bgcolor=#fefefe
| 456136 ||  || — || January 31, 2006 || Kitt Peak || Spacewatch || — || align=right data-sort-value="0.64" | 640 m || 
|-id=137 bgcolor=#fefefe
| 456137 ||  || — || January 8, 2002 || Kitt Peak || Spacewatch || — || align=right data-sort-value="0.81" | 810 m || 
|-id=138 bgcolor=#d6d6d6
| 456138 ||  || — || February 4, 2006 || Mount Lemmon || Mount Lemmon Survey || EOS || align=right | 2.4 km || 
|-id=139 bgcolor=#fefefe
| 456139 ||  || — || February 25, 2006 || Mount Lemmon || Mount Lemmon Survey || — || align=right data-sort-value="0.67" | 670 m || 
|-id=140 bgcolor=#d6d6d6
| 456140 ||  || — || February 25, 2006 || Mount Lemmon || Mount Lemmon Survey || — || align=right | 3.2 km || 
|-id=141 bgcolor=#d6d6d6
| 456141 ||  || — || February 25, 2006 || Kitt Peak || Spacewatch || — || align=right | 2.7 km || 
|-id=142 bgcolor=#d6d6d6
| 456142 ||  || — || February 27, 2006 || Mount Lemmon || Mount Lemmon Survey || VER || align=right | 2.2 km || 
|-id=143 bgcolor=#d6d6d6
| 456143 ||  || — || February 27, 2006 || Kitt Peak || Spacewatch || — || align=right | 2.3 km || 
|-id=144 bgcolor=#fefefe
| 456144 ||  || — || March 1, 2006 || Altschwendt || W. Ries || — || align=right data-sort-value="0.61" | 610 m || 
|-id=145 bgcolor=#d6d6d6
| 456145 ||  || — || February 24, 2006 || Kitt Peak || Spacewatch || EOS || align=right | 1.8 km || 
|-id=146 bgcolor=#d6d6d6
| 456146 ||  || — || February 1, 2006 || Mount Lemmon || Mount Lemmon Survey || — || align=right | 2.5 km || 
|-id=147 bgcolor=#fefefe
| 456147 ||  || — || February 25, 2006 || Kitt Peak || Spacewatch || — || align=right data-sort-value="0.53" | 530 m || 
|-id=148 bgcolor=#d6d6d6
| 456148 ||  || — || March 2, 2006 || Kitt Peak || Spacewatch || — || align=right | 2.7 km || 
|-id=149 bgcolor=#fefefe
| 456149 ||  || — || March 4, 2006 || Mount Lemmon || Mount Lemmon Survey || — || align=right data-sort-value="0.65" | 650 m || 
|-id=150 bgcolor=#d6d6d6
| 456150 ||  || — || March 3, 2006 || Kitt Peak || Spacewatch || — || align=right | 2.7 km || 
|-id=151 bgcolor=#d6d6d6
| 456151 ||  || — || March 23, 2006 || Mount Lemmon || Mount Lemmon Survey || — || align=right | 2.0 km || 
|-id=152 bgcolor=#fefefe
| 456152 ||  || — || March 23, 2006 || Kitt Peak || Spacewatch || — || align=right data-sort-value="0.63" | 630 m || 
|-id=153 bgcolor=#fefefe
| 456153 ||  || — || February 27, 2006 || Kitt Peak || Spacewatch || — || align=right data-sort-value="0.76" | 760 m || 
|-id=154 bgcolor=#d6d6d6
| 456154 ||  || — || March 23, 2006 || Kitt Peak || Spacewatch || — || align=right | 2.3 km || 
|-id=155 bgcolor=#d6d6d6
| 456155 ||  || — || March 2, 2006 || Mount Lemmon || Mount Lemmon Survey || — || align=right | 2.8 km || 
|-id=156 bgcolor=#fefefe
| 456156 ||  || — || March 26, 2006 || Siding Spring || SSS || — || align=right | 3.1 km || 
|-id=157 bgcolor=#d6d6d6
| 456157 ||  || — || March 26, 2006 || Mount Lemmon || Mount Lemmon Survey || — || align=right | 2.5 km || 
|-id=158 bgcolor=#d6d6d6
| 456158 ||  || — || April 2, 2006 || Kitt Peak || Spacewatch || — || align=right | 2.6 km || 
|-id=159 bgcolor=#d6d6d6
| 456159 ||  || — || April 2, 2006 || Bergisch Gladbach || W. Bickel || — || align=right | 3.7 km || 
|-id=160 bgcolor=#d6d6d6
| 456160 ||  || — || April 2, 2006 || Kitt Peak || Spacewatch || — || align=right | 3.0 km || 
|-id=161 bgcolor=#d6d6d6
| 456161 ||  || — || April 2, 2006 || Kitt Peak || Spacewatch || EOS || align=right | 1.4 km || 
|-id=162 bgcolor=#d6d6d6
| 456162 ||  || — || April 2, 2006 || Kitt Peak || Spacewatch || — || align=right | 2.5 km || 
|-id=163 bgcolor=#d6d6d6
| 456163 ||  || — || April 2, 2006 || Kitt Peak || Spacewatch || — || align=right | 2.2 km || 
|-id=164 bgcolor=#fefefe
| 456164 ||  || — || April 2, 2006 || Catalina || CSS || H || align=right data-sort-value="0.79" | 790 m || 
|-id=165 bgcolor=#fefefe
| 456165 ||  || — || April 7, 2006 || Catalina || CSS || — || align=right data-sort-value="0.87" | 870 m || 
|-id=166 bgcolor=#d6d6d6
| 456166 ||  || — || March 4, 2006 || Catalina || CSS || EOS || align=right | 2.5 km || 
|-id=167 bgcolor=#fefefe
| 456167 ||  || — || March 23, 2006 || Kitt Peak || Spacewatch || — || align=right data-sort-value="0.68" | 680 m || 
|-id=168 bgcolor=#fefefe
| 456168 ||  || — || March 23, 2006 || Kitt Peak || Spacewatch || V || align=right data-sort-value="0.42" | 420 m || 
|-id=169 bgcolor=#d6d6d6
| 456169 ||  || — || April 19, 2006 || Kitt Peak || Spacewatch || — || align=right | 3.2 km || 
|-id=170 bgcolor=#d6d6d6
| 456170 ||  || — || April 19, 2006 || Kitt Peak || Spacewatch || — || align=right | 2.6 km || 
|-id=171 bgcolor=#d6d6d6
| 456171 ||  || — || April 19, 2006 || Kitt Peak || Spacewatch || — || align=right | 4.7 km || 
|-id=172 bgcolor=#d6d6d6
| 456172 ||  || — || April 20, 2006 || Kitt Peak || Spacewatch || — || align=right | 2.9 km || 
|-id=173 bgcolor=#fefefe
| 456173 ||  || — || April 20, 2006 || Kitt Peak || Spacewatch || — || align=right data-sort-value="0.58" | 580 m || 
|-id=174 bgcolor=#d6d6d6
| 456174 ||  || — || April 20, 2006 || Kitt Peak || Spacewatch || — || align=right | 3.7 km || 
|-id=175 bgcolor=#d6d6d6
| 456175 ||  || — || April 7, 2006 || Kitt Peak || Spacewatch || EOS || align=right | 1.6 km || 
|-id=176 bgcolor=#d6d6d6
| 456176 ||  || — || February 24, 2006 || Kitt Peak || Spacewatch || EOS || align=right | 2.4 km || 
|-id=177 bgcolor=#d6d6d6
| 456177 ||  || — || March 2, 2006 || Kitt Peak || Spacewatch || — || align=right | 3.7 km || 
|-id=178 bgcolor=#fefefe
| 456178 ||  || — || April 24, 2006 || Kitt Peak || Spacewatch || — || align=right data-sort-value="0.63" | 630 m || 
|-id=179 bgcolor=#d6d6d6
| 456179 ||  || — || April 20, 2006 || Kitt Peak || Spacewatch || VER || align=right | 3.4 km || 
|-id=180 bgcolor=#d6d6d6
| 456180 ||  || — || March 23, 2006 || Kitt Peak || Spacewatch || — || align=right | 2.8 km || 
|-id=181 bgcolor=#d6d6d6
| 456181 ||  || — || April 21, 2006 || Catalina || CSS || — || align=right | 2.1 km || 
|-id=182 bgcolor=#d6d6d6
| 456182 ||  || — || April 24, 2006 || Kitt Peak || Spacewatch || — || align=right | 2.4 km || 
|-id=183 bgcolor=#d6d6d6
| 456183 ||  || — || April 24, 2006 || Kitt Peak || Spacewatch || THM || align=right | 2.4 km || 
|-id=184 bgcolor=#d6d6d6
| 456184 ||  || — || April 24, 2006 || Mount Lemmon || Mount Lemmon Survey || — || align=right | 2.2 km || 
|-id=185 bgcolor=#d6d6d6
| 456185 ||  || — || April 25, 2006 || Kitt Peak || Spacewatch || — || align=right | 3.1 km || 
|-id=186 bgcolor=#d6d6d6
| 456186 ||  || — || April 25, 2006 || Kitt Peak || Spacewatch || EOS || align=right | 1.5 km || 
|-id=187 bgcolor=#d6d6d6
| 456187 ||  || — || April 25, 2006 || Kitt Peak || Spacewatch || EOS || align=right | 1.8 km || 
|-id=188 bgcolor=#d6d6d6
| 456188 ||  || — || March 24, 2006 || Kitt Peak || Spacewatch || — || align=right | 3.0 km || 
|-id=189 bgcolor=#d6d6d6
| 456189 ||  || — || April 26, 2006 || Siding Spring || SSS || — || align=right | 2.9 km || 
|-id=190 bgcolor=#fefefe
| 456190 ||  || — || April 20, 2006 || Catalina || CSS || — || align=right | 1.2 km || 
|-id=191 bgcolor=#d6d6d6
| 456191 ||  || — || April 25, 2006 || Catalina || CSS || — || align=right | 3.7 km || 
|-id=192 bgcolor=#fefefe
| 456192 ||  || — || April 30, 2006 || Kitt Peak || Spacewatch || — || align=right data-sort-value="0.53" | 530 m || 
|-id=193 bgcolor=#d6d6d6
| 456193 ||  || — || April 30, 2006 || Kitt Peak || Spacewatch || — || align=right | 2.7 km || 
|-id=194 bgcolor=#d6d6d6
| 456194 ||  || — || March 5, 2006 || Kitt Peak || Spacewatch || — || align=right | 3.1 km || 
|-id=195 bgcolor=#fefefe
| 456195 ||  || — || April 21, 2006 || Kitt Peak || Spacewatch || (2076) || align=right data-sort-value="0.52" | 520 m || 
|-id=196 bgcolor=#d6d6d6
| 456196 ||  || — || April 30, 2006 || Kitt Peak || Spacewatch || — || align=right | 3.5 km || 
|-id=197 bgcolor=#d6d6d6
| 456197 ||  || — || April 19, 2006 || Kitt Peak || Spacewatch || — || align=right | 3.7 km || 
|-id=198 bgcolor=#d6d6d6
| 456198 ||  || — || April 27, 2006 || Catalina || CSS || — || align=right | 3.5 km || 
|-id=199 bgcolor=#fefefe
| 456199 ||  || — || May 1, 2006 || Kitt Peak || Spacewatch || — || align=right data-sort-value="0.64" | 640 m || 
|-id=200 bgcolor=#d6d6d6
| 456200 ||  || — || May 1, 2006 || Kitt Peak || Spacewatch || — || align=right | 3.8 km || 
|}

456201–456300 

|-bgcolor=#d6d6d6
| 456201 ||  || — || May 3, 2006 || Kitt Peak || Spacewatch || — || align=right | 4.0 km || 
|-id=202 bgcolor=#fefefe
| 456202 ||  || — || May 2, 2006 || Kitt Peak || Spacewatch || — || align=right data-sort-value="0.76" | 760 m || 
|-id=203 bgcolor=#d6d6d6
| 456203 ||  || — || April 24, 2006 || Kitt Peak || Spacewatch || — || align=right | 2.6 km || 
|-id=204 bgcolor=#fefefe
| 456204 ||  || — || April 24, 2006 || Kitt Peak || Spacewatch || — || align=right | 1.0 km || 
|-id=205 bgcolor=#d6d6d6
| 456205 ||  || — || May 3, 2006 || Kitt Peak || Spacewatch || — || align=right | 3.0 km || 
|-id=206 bgcolor=#fefefe
| 456206 ||  || — || April 29, 2006 || Kitt Peak || Spacewatch || — || align=right data-sort-value="0.91" | 910 m || 
|-id=207 bgcolor=#fefefe
| 456207 ||  || — || February 19, 2002 || Cima Ekar || ADAS || — || align=right data-sort-value="0.68" | 680 m || 
|-id=208 bgcolor=#fefefe
| 456208 ||  || — || May 4, 2006 || Kitt Peak || Spacewatch || — || align=right data-sort-value="0.97" | 970 m || 
|-id=209 bgcolor=#d6d6d6
| 456209 ||  || — || May 8, 2006 || Mount Lemmon || Mount Lemmon Survey || THB || align=right | 2.9 km || 
|-id=210 bgcolor=#d6d6d6
| 456210 ||  || — || April 24, 2006 || Kitt Peak || Spacewatch || — || align=right | 3.5 km || 
|-id=211 bgcolor=#fefefe
| 456211 ||  || — || May 19, 2006 || Mount Lemmon || Mount Lemmon Survey || H || align=right data-sort-value="0.72" | 720 m || 
|-id=212 bgcolor=#d6d6d6
| 456212 ||  || — || May 1, 2006 || Catalina || CSS || — || align=right | 3.2 km || 
|-id=213 bgcolor=#fefefe
| 456213 ||  || — || May 16, 2006 || Palomar || NEAT || — || align=right data-sort-value="0.91" | 910 m || 
|-id=214 bgcolor=#d6d6d6
| 456214 ||  || — || May 20, 2006 || Catalina || CSS || — || align=right | 3.4 km || 
|-id=215 bgcolor=#d6d6d6
| 456215 ||  || — || May 20, 2006 || Kitt Peak || Spacewatch || — || align=right | 3.0 km || 
|-id=216 bgcolor=#fefefe
| 456216 ||  || — || May 20, 2006 || Kitt Peak || Spacewatch || — || align=right data-sort-value="0.70" | 700 m || 
|-id=217 bgcolor=#d6d6d6
| 456217 ||  || — || May 21, 2006 || Mount Lemmon || Mount Lemmon Survey || — || align=right | 2.6 km || 
|-id=218 bgcolor=#d6d6d6
| 456218 ||  || — || May 22, 2006 || Kitt Peak || Spacewatch || — || align=right | 3.8 km || 
|-id=219 bgcolor=#d6d6d6
| 456219 ||  || — || May 19, 2006 || Catalina || CSS || Tj (2.97) || align=right | 3.2 km || 
|-id=220 bgcolor=#d6d6d6
| 456220 ||  || — || May 21, 2006 || Kitt Peak || Spacewatch || — || align=right | 3.4 km || 
|-id=221 bgcolor=#d6d6d6
| 456221 ||  || — || May 21, 2006 || Kitt Peak || Spacewatch || EOS || align=right | 2.2 km || 
|-id=222 bgcolor=#fefefe
| 456222 ||  || — || April 20, 2006 || Kitt Peak || Spacewatch || — || align=right data-sort-value="0.62" | 620 m || 
|-id=223 bgcolor=#d6d6d6
| 456223 ||  || — || May 21, 2006 || Mount Lemmon || Mount Lemmon Survey || — || align=right | 4.1 km || 
|-id=224 bgcolor=#fefefe
| 456224 ||  || — || May 21, 2006 || Kitt Peak || Spacewatch || H || align=right data-sort-value="0.68" | 680 m || 
|-id=225 bgcolor=#d6d6d6
| 456225 ||  || — || May 21, 2006 || Kitt Peak || Spacewatch || — || align=right | 2.8 km || 
|-id=226 bgcolor=#fefefe
| 456226 ||  || — || May 22, 2006 || Kitt Peak || Spacewatch || — || align=right data-sort-value="0.75" | 750 m || 
|-id=227 bgcolor=#fefefe
| 456227 ||  || — || May 8, 2006 || Mount Lemmon || Mount Lemmon Survey || — || align=right | 1.0 km || 
|-id=228 bgcolor=#fefefe
| 456228 ||  || — || May 22, 2006 || Kitt Peak || Spacewatch || — || align=right data-sort-value="0.66" | 660 m || 
|-id=229 bgcolor=#d6d6d6
| 456229 ||  || — || May 24, 2006 || Kitt Peak || Spacewatch || — || align=right | 2.8 km || 
|-id=230 bgcolor=#d6d6d6
| 456230 ||  || — || May 9, 2006 || Mount Lemmon || Mount Lemmon Survey || — || align=right | 2.8 km || 
|-id=231 bgcolor=#fefefe
| 456231 ||  || — || May 26, 2006 || Mount Lemmon || Mount Lemmon Survey || H || align=right data-sort-value="0.81" | 810 m || 
|-id=232 bgcolor=#fefefe
| 456232 ||  || — || May 25, 2006 || Kitt Peak || Spacewatch || — || align=right data-sort-value="0.94" | 940 m || 
|-id=233 bgcolor=#d6d6d6
| 456233 ||  || — || May 25, 2006 || Kitt Peak || Spacewatch || — || align=right | 2.8 km || 
|-id=234 bgcolor=#fefefe
| 456234 ||  || — || May 28, 2006 || Kitt Peak || Spacewatch || H || align=right data-sort-value="0.48" | 480 m || 
|-id=235 bgcolor=#fefefe
| 456235 ||  || — || May 29, 2006 || Kitt Peak || Spacewatch || — || align=right | 1.3 km || 
|-id=236 bgcolor=#d6d6d6
| 456236 ||  || — || May 20, 2006 || Kitt Peak || Spacewatch || — || align=right | 3.2 km || 
|-id=237 bgcolor=#FA8072
| 456237 ||  || — || June 20, 2006 || Mount Lemmon || Mount Lemmon Survey || — || align=right data-sort-value="0.94" | 940 m || 
|-id=238 bgcolor=#fefefe
| 456238 ||  || — || June 18, 2006 || Kitt Peak || Spacewatch || V || align=right data-sort-value="0.67" | 670 m || 
|-id=239 bgcolor=#d6d6d6
| 456239 ||  || — || June 20, 2006 || Kitt Peak || Spacewatch || — || align=right | 3.5 km || 
|-id=240 bgcolor=#E9E9E9
| 456240 ||  || — || July 18, 2006 || Bergisch Gladbac || W. Bickel || — || align=right | 1.4 km || 
|-id=241 bgcolor=#E9E9E9
| 456241 ||  || — || July 21, 2006 || Mount Lemmon || Mount Lemmon Survey || — || align=right | 1.6 km || 
|-id=242 bgcolor=#E9E9E9
| 456242 ||  || — || July 20, 2006 || Palomar || NEAT || — || align=right data-sort-value="0.94" | 940 m || 
|-id=243 bgcolor=#d6d6d6
| 456243 ||  || — || March 11, 2005 || Mount Lemmon || Mount Lemmon Survey || — || align=right | 3.5 km || 
|-id=244 bgcolor=#fefefe
| 456244 ||  || — || August 12, 2006 || Palomar || NEAT || H || align=right data-sort-value="0.95" | 950 m || 
|-id=245 bgcolor=#fefefe
| 456245 ||  || — || August 12, 2006 || Palomar || NEAT || — || align=right | 1.4 km || 
|-id=246 bgcolor=#fefefe
| 456246 ||  || — || August 15, 2006 || Palomar || NEAT || — || align=right data-sort-value="0.96" | 960 m || 
|-id=247 bgcolor=#E9E9E9
| 456247 ||  || — || August 13, 2006 || Palomar || NEAT || — || align=right | 2.3 km || 
|-id=248 bgcolor=#E9E9E9
| 456248 ||  || — || August 18, 2006 || Kitt Peak || Spacewatch || (5) || align=right data-sort-value="0.77" | 770 m || 
|-id=249 bgcolor=#d6d6d6
| 456249 ||  || — || August 17, 2006 || Palomar || NEAT || — || align=right | 4.3 km || 
|-id=250 bgcolor=#E9E9E9
| 456250 ||  || — || August 17, 2006 || Palomar || NEAT || — || align=right | 2.2 km || 
|-id=251 bgcolor=#d6d6d6
| 456251 ||  || — || August 21, 2006 || Kitt Peak || Spacewatch || 3:2critical || align=right | 3.1 km || 
|-id=252 bgcolor=#E9E9E9
| 456252 ||  || — || August 17, 2006 || Palomar || NEAT || — || align=right | 1.0 km || 
|-id=253 bgcolor=#d6d6d6
| 456253 ||  || — || August 19, 2006 || Anderson Mesa || LONEOS || — || align=right | 3.2 km || 
|-id=254 bgcolor=#E9E9E9
| 456254 ||  || — || August 27, 2006 || Kitt Peak || Spacewatch || EUN || align=right | 1.1 km || 
|-id=255 bgcolor=#E9E9E9
| 456255 ||  || — || August 19, 2006 || Kitt Peak || Spacewatch || — || align=right | 1.4 km || 
|-id=256 bgcolor=#fefefe
| 456256 ||  || — || August 24, 2006 || Socorro || LINEAR || — || align=right | 2.3 km || 
|-id=257 bgcolor=#FA8072
| 456257 ||  || — || August 22, 2006 || Siding Spring || SSS || H || align=right data-sort-value="0.98" | 980 m || 
|-id=258 bgcolor=#E9E9E9
| 456258 ||  || — || August 18, 2006 || Kitt Peak || Spacewatch || — || align=right | 1.6 km || 
|-id=259 bgcolor=#E9E9E9
| 456259 ||  || — || August 18, 2006 || Kitt Peak || Spacewatch || (5) || align=right data-sort-value="0.67" | 670 m || 
|-id=260 bgcolor=#E9E9E9
| 456260 ||  || — || August 29, 2006 || Anderson Mesa || LONEOS || — || align=right | 1.3 km || 
|-id=261 bgcolor=#E9E9E9
| 456261 ||  || — || August 18, 2006 || Kitt Peak || Spacewatch || — || align=right | 1.6 km || 
|-id=262 bgcolor=#E9E9E9
| 456262 ||  || — || August 27, 2006 || Kitt Peak || Spacewatch || — || align=right data-sort-value="0.82" | 820 m || 
|-id=263 bgcolor=#E9E9E9
| 456263 ||  || — || September 12, 2006 || Catalina || CSS || — || align=right | 1.3 km || 
|-id=264 bgcolor=#E9E9E9
| 456264 ||  || — || September 15, 2006 || Kitt Peak || Spacewatch || — || align=right data-sort-value="0.94" | 940 m || 
|-id=265 bgcolor=#E9E9E9
| 456265 ||  || — || September 12, 2006 || Catalina || CSS || — || align=right | 1.4 km || 
|-id=266 bgcolor=#E9E9E9
| 456266 ||  || — || September 14, 2006 || Catalina || CSS || — || align=right | 1.9 km || 
|-id=267 bgcolor=#E9E9E9
| 456267 ||  || — || September 12, 2006 || Catalina || CSS || (5) || align=right data-sort-value="0.70" | 700 m || 
|-id=268 bgcolor=#E9E9E9
| 456268 ||  || — || September 14, 2006 || Kitt Peak || Spacewatch || — || align=right | 1.2 km || 
|-id=269 bgcolor=#E9E9E9
| 456269 ||  || — || September 14, 2006 || Kitt Peak || Spacewatch || (5) || align=right data-sort-value="0.77" | 770 m || 
|-id=270 bgcolor=#E9E9E9
| 456270 ||  || — || September 14, 2006 || Kitt Peak || Spacewatch || — || align=right data-sort-value="0.80" | 800 m || 
|-id=271 bgcolor=#E9E9E9
| 456271 ||  || — || September 14, 2006 || Kitt Peak || Spacewatch || — || align=right data-sort-value="0.75" | 750 m || 
|-id=272 bgcolor=#E9E9E9
| 456272 ||  || — || September 14, 2006 || Kitt Peak || Spacewatch || — || align=right | 1.4 km || 
|-id=273 bgcolor=#E9E9E9
| 456273 ||  || — || August 18, 2006 || Kitt Peak || Spacewatch || (5) || align=right data-sort-value="0.71" | 710 m || 
|-id=274 bgcolor=#E9E9E9
| 456274 ||  || — || September 15, 2006 || Kitt Peak || Spacewatch || — || align=right | 1.2 km || 
|-id=275 bgcolor=#fefefe
| 456275 ||  || — || September 15, 2006 || Kitt Peak || Spacewatch || NYS || align=right data-sort-value="0.61" | 610 m || 
|-id=276 bgcolor=#E9E9E9
| 456276 ||  || — || September 15, 2006 || Kitt Peak || Spacewatch || — || align=right | 1.3 km || 
|-id=277 bgcolor=#E9E9E9
| 456277 ||  || — || September 15, 2006 || Kitt Peak || Spacewatch || — || align=right data-sort-value="0.71" | 710 m || 
|-id=278 bgcolor=#E9E9E9
| 456278 ||  || — || March 15, 2004 || Kitt Peak || Spacewatch || (5) || align=right data-sort-value="0.61" | 610 m || 
|-id=279 bgcolor=#fefefe
| 456279 ||  || — || September 14, 2006 || Mauna Kea || J. Masiero || NYS || align=right data-sort-value="0.61" | 610 m || 
|-id=280 bgcolor=#E9E9E9
| 456280 ||  || — || September 16, 2006 || Kitt Peak || Spacewatch || — || align=right | 1.6 km || 
|-id=281 bgcolor=#fefefe
| 456281 ||  || — || September 16, 2006 || Catalina || CSS || H || align=right data-sort-value="0.90" | 900 m || 
|-id=282 bgcolor=#E9E9E9
| 456282 ||  || — || August 27, 2006 || Anderson Mesa || LONEOS || — || align=right | 1.4 km || 
|-id=283 bgcolor=#E9E9E9
| 456283 ||  || — || September 17, 2006 || Kitt Peak || Spacewatch || — || align=right data-sort-value="0.71" | 710 m || 
|-id=284 bgcolor=#E9E9E9
| 456284 ||  || — || September 16, 2006 || Catalina || CSS || — || align=right | 1.5 km || 
|-id=285 bgcolor=#E9E9E9
| 456285 ||  || — || September 19, 2006 || Catalina || CSS || — || align=right | 1.3 km || 
|-id=286 bgcolor=#E9E9E9
| 456286 ||  || — || September 19, 2006 || Kitt Peak || Spacewatch || — || align=right | 1.2 km || 
|-id=287 bgcolor=#E9E9E9
| 456287 ||  || — || September 20, 2006 || Kitt Peak || Spacewatch || — || align=right data-sort-value="0.94" | 940 m || 
|-id=288 bgcolor=#FA8072
| 456288 ||  || — || September 19, 2006 || Catalina || CSS || — || align=right | 1.1 km || 
|-id=289 bgcolor=#E9E9E9
| 456289 ||  || — || September 18, 2006 || Kitt Peak || Spacewatch || — || align=right | 1.2 km || 
|-id=290 bgcolor=#E9E9E9
| 456290 ||  || — || September 18, 2006 || Kitt Peak || Spacewatch || — || align=right data-sort-value="0.90" | 900 m || 
|-id=291 bgcolor=#E9E9E9
| 456291 ||  || — || September 18, 2006 || Kitt Peak || Spacewatch || — || align=right | 1.0 km || 
|-id=292 bgcolor=#E9E9E9
| 456292 ||  || — || September 18, 2006 || Kitt Peak || Spacewatch || — || align=right | 1.4 km || 
|-id=293 bgcolor=#E9E9E9
| 456293 ||  || — || September 19, 2006 || Catalina || CSS || — || align=right | 2.1 km || 
|-id=294 bgcolor=#E9E9E9
| 456294 ||  || — || September 20, 2006 || Socorro || LINEAR || — || align=right | 1.4 km || 
|-id=295 bgcolor=#E9E9E9
| 456295 ||  || — || September 24, 2006 || Anderson Mesa || LONEOS || — || align=right | 1.7 km || 
|-id=296 bgcolor=#fefefe
| 456296 ||  || — || September 18, 2006 || Catalina || CSS || H || align=right | 1.0 km || 
|-id=297 bgcolor=#E9E9E9
| 456297 ||  || — || September 18, 2006 || Catalina || CSS || — || align=right | 1.4 km || 
|-id=298 bgcolor=#E9E9E9
| 456298 ||  || — || September 19, 2006 || Catalina || CSS || — || align=right | 1.7 km || 
|-id=299 bgcolor=#d6d6d6
| 456299 ||  || — || September 17, 2006 || Anderson Mesa || LONEOS || — || align=right | 3.7 km || 
|-id=300 bgcolor=#E9E9E9
| 456300 ||  || — || September 17, 2006 || Catalina || CSS || — || align=right | 1.4 km || 
|}

456301–456400 

|-bgcolor=#FFC2E0
| 456301 ||  || — || September 28, 2006 || Catalina || CSS || APOcritical || align=right data-sort-value="0.65" | 650 m || 
|-id=302 bgcolor=#fefefe
| 456302 ||  || — || September 21, 2006 || Anderson Mesa || LONEOS || H || align=right data-sort-value="0.87" | 870 m || 
|-id=303 bgcolor=#E9E9E9
| 456303 ||  || — || September 19, 2006 || Kitt Peak || Spacewatch || — || align=right data-sort-value="0.96" | 960 m || 
|-id=304 bgcolor=#E9E9E9
| 456304 ||  || — || September 19, 2006 || Kitt Peak || Spacewatch || — || align=right data-sort-value="0.98" | 980 m || 
|-id=305 bgcolor=#E9E9E9
| 456305 ||  || — || September 19, 2006 || Kitt Peak || Spacewatch || — || align=right | 1.3 km || 
|-id=306 bgcolor=#E9E9E9
| 456306 ||  || — || September 25, 2006 || Kitt Peak || Spacewatch || — || align=right data-sort-value="0.86" | 860 m || 
|-id=307 bgcolor=#d6d6d6
| 456307 ||  || — || September 26, 2006 || Kitt Peak || Spacewatch || 3:2 || align=right | 3.7 km || 
|-id=308 bgcolor=#fefefe
| 456308 ||  || — || September 26, 2006 || Kitt Peak || Spacewatch || MAS || align=right data-sort-value="0.69" | 690 m || 
|-id=309 bgcolor=#E9E9E9
| 456309 ||  || — || September 24, 2006 || Kitt Peak || Spacewatch || — || align=right | 1.4 km || 
|-id=310 bgcolor=#E9E9E9
| 456310 ||  || — || September 16, 2006 || Kitt Peak || Spacewatch || — || align=right data-sort-value="0.68" | 680 m || 
|-id=311 bgcolor=#E9E9E9
| 456311 ||  || — || September 27, 2006 || Kitt Peak || Spacewatch || critical || align=right | 1.2 km || 
|-id=312 bgcolor=#E9E9E9
| 456312 ||  || — || September 26, 2006 || Kitt Peak || Spacewatch || — || align=right data-sort-value="0.82" | 820 m || 
|-id=313 bgcolor=#E9E9E9
| 456313 ||  || — || September 18, 2006 || Kitt Peak || Spacewatch || — || align=right | 1.4 km || 
|-id=314 bgcolor=#E9E9E9
| 456314 ||  || — || September 18, 2006 || Kitt Peak || Spacewatch || — || align=right data-sort-value="0.92" | 920 m || 
|-id=315 bgcolor=#E9E9E9
| 456315 ||  || — || September 26, 2006 || Mount Lemmon || Mount Lemmon Survey || — || align=right data-sort-value="0.62" | 620 m || 
|-id=316 bgcolor=#E9E9E9
| 456316 ||  || — || September 26, 2006 || Kitt Peak || Spacewatch || — || align=right data-sort-value="0.94" | 940 m || 
|-id=317 bgcolor=#fefefe
| 456317 ||  || — || September 26, 2006 || Catalina || CSS || — || align=right data-sort-value="0.97" | 970 m || 
|-id=318 bgcolor=#E9E9E9
| 456318 ||  || — || September 22, 2006 || Anderson Mesa || LONEOS || — || align=right | 1.9 km || 
|-id=319 bgcolor=#E9E9E9
| 456319 ||  || — || September 26, 2006 || Catalina || CSS || — || align=right | 2.1 km || 
|-id=320 bgcolor=#E9E9E9
| 456320 ||  || — || September 25, 2006 || Kitt Peak || Spacewatch || — || align=right data-sort-value="0.67" | 670 m || 
|-id=321 bgcolor=#E9E9E9
| 456321 ||  || — || September 27, 2006 || Kitt Peak || Spacewatch || — || align=right data-sort-value="0.90" | 900 m || 
|-id=322 bgcolor=#E9E9E9
| 456322 ||  || — || September 27, 2006 || Kitt Peak || Spacewatch || BRG || align=right | 1.0 km || 
|-id=323 bgcolor=#fefefe
| 456323 ||  || — || September 17, 2006 || Kitt Peak || Spacewatch || NYS || align=right data-sort-value="0.72" | 720 m || 
|-id=324 bgcolor=#E9E9E9
| 456324 ||  || — || September 27, 2006 || Kitt Peak || Spacewatch ||  || align=right | 1.4 km || 
|-id=325 bgcolor=#E9E9E9
| 456325 ||  || — || September 28, 2006 || Kitt Peak || Spacewatch || — || align=right | 1.2 km || 
|-id=326 bgcolor=#E9E9E9
| 456326 ||  || — || September 28, 2006 || Kitt Peak || Spacewatch || — || align=right | 1.2 km || 
|-id=327 bgcolor=#E9E9E9
| 456327 ||  || — || September 28, 2006 || Kitt Peak || Spacewatch || — || align=right | 1.3 km || 
|-id=328 bgcolor=#E9E9E9
| 456328 ||  || — || September 28, 2006 || Kitt Peak || Spacewatch || — || align=right | 1.4 km || 
|-id=329 bgcolor=#E9E9E9
| 456329 ||  || — || September 18, 2006 || Kitt Peak || Spacewatch || — || align=right | 1.1 km || 
|-id=330 bgcolor=#E9E9E9
| 456330 ||  || — || September 18, 2006 || Kitt Peak || Spacewatch || — || align=right data-sort-value="0.79" | 790 m || 
|-id=331 bgcolor=#E9E9E9
| 456331 ||  || — || September 14, 2006 || Catalina || CSS || — || align=right | 2.1 km || 
|-id=332 bgcolor=#E9E9E9
| 456332 ||  || — || September 30, 2006 || Catalina || CSS || — || align=right | 1.2 km || 
|-id=333 bgcolor=#E9E9E9
| 456333 ||  || — || September 27, 2006 || Mount Lemmon || Mount Lemmon Survey || — || align=right | 2.3 km || 
|-id=334 bgcolor=#E9E9E9
| 456334 ||  || — || September 30, 2006 || Mount Lemmon || Mount Lemmon Survey || — || align=right data-sort-value="0.95" | 950 m || 
|-id=335 bgcolor=#E9E9E9
| 456335 ||  || — || September 19, 2006 || Kitt Peak || Spacewatch || — || align=right | 1.0 km || 
|-id=336 bgcolor=#E9E9E9
| 456336 ||  || — || September 26, 2006 || Mount Lemmon || Mount Lemmon Survey || — || align=right | 1.1 km || 
|-id=337 bgcolor=#E9E9E9
| 456337 ||  || — || November 28, 1994 || Kitt Peak || Spacewatch || KON || align=right | 1.9 km || 
|-id=338 bgcolor=#E9E9E9
| 456338 ||  || — || September 19, 2006 || Catalina || CSS || — || align=right | 1.2 km || 
|-id=339 bgcolor=#fefefe
| 456339 ||  || — || October 1, 2006 || Eskridge || Farpoint Obs. || H || align=right data-sort-value="0.80" | 800 m || 
|-id=340 bgcolor=#E9E9E9
| 456340 ||  || — || September 28, 2006 || Catalina || CSS || — || align=right | 1.4 km || 
|-id=341 bgcolor=#fefefe
| 456341 ||  || — || October 10, 2006 || Palomar || NEAT || — || align=right data-sort-value="0.96" | 960 m || 
|-id=342 bgcolor=#E9E9E9
| 456342 ||  || — || September 30, 2006 || Mount Lemmon || Mount Lemmon Survey || MIS || align=right | 1.9 km || 
|-id=343 bgcolor=#E9E9E9
| 456343 ||  || — || September 25, 2006 || Mount Lemmon || Mount Lemmon Survey || EUN || align=right | 1.0 km || 
|-id=344 bgcolor=#E9E9E9
| 456344 ||  || — || September 27, 2006 || Mount Lemmon || Mount Lemmon Survey || — || align=right | 1.9 km || 
|-id=345 bgcolor=#E9E9E9
| 456345 ||  || — || September 30, 2006 || Mount Lemmon || Mount Lemmon Survey || ADE || align=right | 1.6 km || 
|-id=346 bgcolor=#E9E9E9
| 456346 ||  || — || October 12, 2006 || Kitt Peak || Spacewatch || — || align=right data-sort-value="0.76" | 760 m || 
|-id=347 bgcolor=#E9E9E9
| 456347 ||  || — || October 12, 2006 || Kitt Peak || Spacewatch || — || align=right data-sort-value="0.80" | 800 m || 
|-id=348 bgcolor=#E9E9E9
| 456348 ||  || — || October 12, 2006 || Kitt Peak || Spacewatch || — || align=right | 1.7 km || 
|-id=349 bgcolor=#E9E9E9
| 456349 ||  || — || October 13, 2006 || Kitt Peak || Spacewatch || — || align=right data-sort-value="0.84" | 840 m || 
|-id=350 bgcolor=#E9E9E9
| 456350 ||  || — || October 11, 2006 || Palomar || NEAT || — || align=right | 2.0 km || 
|-id=351 bgcolor=#E9E9E9
| 456351 ||  || — || August 28, 2006 || Catalina || CSS || JUN || align=right data-sort-value="0.97" | 970 m || 
|-id=352 bgcolor=#E9E9E9
| 456352 ||  || — || October 12, 2006 || Kitt Peak || Spacewatch || — || align=right | 1.5 km || 
|-id=353 bgcolor=#E9E9E9
| 456353 ||  || — || September 26, 2006 || Mount Lemmon || Mount Lemmon Survey || — || align=right | 1.8 km || 
|-id=354 bgcolor=#E9E9E9
| 456354 ||  || — || October 13, 2006 || Kitt Peak || Spacewatch || — || align=right | 1.5 km || 
|-id=355 bgcolor=#E9E9E9
| 456355 ||  || — || October 13, 2006 || Kitt Peak || Spacewatch || — || align=right | 1.1 km || 
|-id=356 bgcolor=#E9E9E9
| 456356 ||  || — || October 13, 2006 || Kitt Peak || Spacewatch || — || align=right data-sort-value="0.73" | 730 m || 
|-id=357 bgcolor=#E9E9E9
| 456357 ||  || — || October 13, 2006 || Kitt Peak || Spacewatch || EUN || align=right data-sort-value="0.92" | 920 m || 
|-id=358 bgcolor=#E9E9E9
| 456358 ||  || — || October 13, 2006 || Kitt Peak || Spacewatch || — || align=right | 2.4 km || 
|-id=359 bgcolor=#E9E9E9
| 456359 ||  || — || October 15, 2006 || Kitt Peak || Spacewatch || — || align=right | 1.0 km || 
|-id=360 bgcolor=#E9E9E9
| 456360 ||  || — || October 15, 2006 || Kitt Peak || Spacewatch || — || align=right | 1.0 km || 
|-id=361 bgcolor=#E9E9E9
| 456361 ||  || — || October 15, 2006 || Kitt Peak || Spacewatch || — || align=right | 1.0 km || 
|-id=362 bgcolor=#d6d6d6
| 456362 ||  || — || July 21, 2006 || Mount Lemmon || Mount Lemmon Survey || Tj (2.96) || align=right | 3.2 km || 
|-id=363 bgcolor=#E9E9E9
| 456363 ||  || — || October 3, 2006 || Mount Lemmon || Mount Lemmon Survey || — || align=right | 2.3 km || 
|-id=364 bgcolor=#E9E9E9
| 456364 ||  || — || February 25, 2004 || Desert Eagle || W. K. Y. Yeung || — || align=right | 1.4 km || 
|-id=365 bgcolor=#E9E9E9
| 456365 ||  || — || October 1, 2006 || Apache Point || A. C. Becker || — || align=right data-sort-value="0.92" | 920 m || 
|-id=366 bgcolor=#E9E9E9
| 456366 ||  || — || October 2, 2006 || Mount Lemmon || Mount Lemmon Survey || — || align=right data-sort-value="0.74" | 740 m || 
|-id=367 bgcolor=#E9E9E9
| 456367 ||  || — || October 11, 2006 || Palomar || NEAT || — || align=right | 2.1 km || 
|-id=368 bgcolor=#E9E9E9
| 456368 ||  || — || October 16, 2006 || Kitami || K. Endate || — || align=right | 2.7 km || 
|-id=369 bgcolor=#E9E9E9
| 456369 ||  || — || September 30, 2006 || Mount Lemmon || Mount Lemmon Survey || — || align=right | 1.6 km || 
|-id=370 bgcolor=#E9E9E9
| 456370 ||  || — || October 17, 2006 || Mount Lemmon || Mount Lemmon Survey || — || align=right | 1.6 km || 
|-id=371 bgcolor=#E9E9E9
| 456371 ||  || — || October 16, 2006 || Kitt Peak || Spacewatch || — || align=right | 1.5 km || 
|-id=372 bgcolor=#E9E9E9
| 456372 ||  || — || October 4, 2006 || Mount Lemmon || Mount Lemmon Survey || — || align=right data-sort-value="0.98" | 980 m || 
|-id=373 bgcolor=#E9E9E9
| 456373 ||  || — || October 16, 2006 || Kitt Peak || Spacewatch || — || align=right data-sort-value="0.92" | 920 m || 
|-id=374 bgcolor=#E9E9E9
| 456374 ||  || — || September 30, 2006 || Mount Lemmon || Mount Lemmon Survey || — || align=right | 1.8 km || 
|-id=375 bgcolor=#E9E9E9
| 456375 ||  || — || October 17, 2006 || Kitt Peak || Spacewatch || — || align=right | 1.5 km || 
|-id=376 bgcolor=#E9E9E9
| 456376 ||  || — || October 17, 2006 || Mount Lemmon || Mount Lemmon Survey || — || align=right | 2.2 km || 
|-id=377 bgcolor=#E9E9E9
| 456377 ||  || — || October 18, 2006 || Kitt Peak || Spacewatch || — || align=right | 1.8 km || 
|-id=378 bgcolor=#E9E9E9
| 456378 Akashikaikyo ||  ||  || October 18, 2006 || Vallemare di Borbona || V. S. Casulli || EUN || align=right data-sort-value="0.92" | 920 m || 
|-id=379 bgcolor=#E9E9E9
| 456379 ||  || — || September 30, 2006 || Kitt Peak || Spacewatch || — || align=right | 1.3 km || 
|-id=380 bgcolor=#E9E9E9
| 456380 ||  || — || October 17, 2006 || Kitt Peak || Spacewatch || (5) || align=right data-sort-value="0.70" | 700 m || 
|-id=381 bgcolor=#E9E9E9
| 456381 ||  || — || October 17, 2006 || Kitt Peak || Spacewatch || — || align=right | 1.1 km || 
|-id=382 bgcolor=#E9E9E9
| 456382 ||  || — || October 4, 2006 || Mount Lemmon || Mount Lemmon Survey || — || align=right | 1.4 km || 
|-id=383 bgcolor=#E9E9E9
| 456383 ||  || — || October 17, 2006 || Kitt Peak || Spacewatch || — || align=right | 1.3 km || 
|-id=384 bgcolor=#E9E9E9
| 456384 ||  || — || October 17, 2006 || Kitt Peak || Spacewatch || — || align=right | 1.4 km || 
|-id=385 bgcolor=#E9E9E9
| 456385 ||  || — || September 26, 2006 || Mount Lemmon || Mount Lemmon Survey || — || align=right | 1.2 km || 
|-id=386 bgcolor=#E9E9E9
| 456386 ||  || — || September 30, 2006 || Mount Lemmon || Mount Lemmon Survey || — || align=right | 1.2 km || 
|-id=387 bgcolor=#E9E9E9
| 456387 ||  || — || October 19, 2006 || Kitt Peak || Spacewatch || — || align=right data-sort-value="0.72" | 720 m || 
|-id=388 bgcolor=#E9E9E9
| 456388 ||  || — || October 19, 2006 || Kitt Peak || Spacewatch || — || align=right | 1.2 km || 
|-id=389 bgcolor=#E9E9E9
| 456389 ||  || — || October 19, 2006 || Kitt Peak || Spacewatch || — || align=right | 1.5 km || 
|-id=390 bgcolor=#E9E9E9
| 456390 ||  || — || October 19, 2006 || Kitt Peak || Spacewatch || MAR || align=right data-sort-value="0.88" | 880 m || 
|-id=391 bgcolor=#E9E9E9
| 456391 ||  || — || September 19, 2006 || Kitt Peak || Spacewatch || — || align=right data-sort-value="0.78" | 780 m || 
|-id=392 bgcolor=#E9E9E9
| 456392 ||  || — || September 27, 2006 || Catalina || CSS || — || align=right | 1.8 km || 
|-id=393 bgcolor=#E9E9E9
| 456393 ||  || — || October 20, 2006 || Catalina || CSS || — || align=right | 1.4 km || 
|-id=394 bgcolor=#E9E9E9
| 456394 ||  || — || October 21, 2006 || Mount Lemmon || Mount Lemmon Survey || (5) || align=right data-sort-value="0.72" | 720 m || 
|-id=395 bgcolor=#E9E9E9
| 456395 ||  || — || October 16, 2006 || Catalina || CSS || — || align=right | 1.3 km || 
|-id=396 bgcolor=#E9E9E9
| 456396 ||  || — || October 16, 2006 || Catalina || CSS || — || align=right | 1.6 km || 
|-id=397 bgcolor=#E9E9E9
| 456397 ||  || — || October 17, 2006 || Catalina || CSS || — || align=right | 2.0 km || 
|-id=398 bgcolor=#E9E9E9
| 456398 ||  || — || October 19, 2006 || Catalina || CSS || — || align=right | 1.1 km || 
|-id=399 bgcolor=#E9E9E9
| 456399 ||  || — || October 20, 2006 || Kitt Peak || Spacewatch || — || align=right | 1.6 km || 
|-id=400 bgcolor=#E9E9E9
| 456400 ||  || — || October 22, 2006 || Palomar || NEAT || — || align=right | 1.9 km || 
|}

456401–456500 

|-bgcolor=#E9E9E9
| 456401 ||  || — || October 23, 2006 || Palomar || NEAT || — || align=right | 1.3 km || 
|-id=402 bgcolor=#E9E9E9
| 456402 ||  || — || October 23, 2006 || Kitt Peak || Spacewatch || (5) || align=right data-sort-value="0.69" | 690 m || 
|-id=403 bgcolor=#E9E9E9
| 456403 ||  || — || October 23, 2006 || Kitt Peak || Spacewatch || — || align=right data-sort-value="0.81" | 810 m || 
|-id=404 bgcolor=#E9E9E9
| 456404 ||  || — || September 30, 2006 || Catalina || CSS || MIS || align=right | 2.5 km || 
|-id=405 bgcolor=#E9E9E9
| 456405 ||  || — || October 16, 2006 || Kitt Peak || Spacewatch || (5) || align=right data-sort-value="0.86" | 860 m || 
|-id=406 bgcolor=#E9E9E9
| 456406 ||  || — || October 4, 2006 || Mount Lemmon || Mount Lemmon Survey || — || align=right | 1.1 km || 
|-id=407 bgcolor=#E9E9E9
| 456407 ||  || — || October 2, 2006 || Mount Lemmon || Mount Lemmon Survey || — || align=right data-sort-value="0.85" | 850 m || 
|-id=408 bgcolor=#E9E9E9
| 456408 ||  || — || October 17, 2006 || Kitt Peak || Spacewatch || MAR || align=right data-sort-value="0.93" | 930 m || 
|-id=409 bgcolor=#E9E9E9
| 456409 ||  || — || October 27, 2006 || Mount Lemmon || Mount Lemmon Survey ||  || align=right | 1.3 km || 
|-id=410 bgcolor=#E9E9E9
| 456410 ||  || — || October 19, 2006 || Catalina || CSS || — || align=right | 1.5 km || 
|-id=411 bgcolor=#E9E9E9
| 456411 ||  || — || October 27, 2006 || Mount Lemmon || Mount Lemmon Survey || — || align=right | 1.1 km || 
|-id=412 bgcolor=#E9E9E9
| 456412 ||  || — || October 28, 2006 || Kitt Peak || Spacewatch || — || align=right data-sort-value="0.96" | 960 m || 
|-id=413 bgcolor=#E9E9E9
| 456413 ||  || — || October 28, 2006 || Kitt Peak || Spacewatch || — || align=right | 1.6 km || 
|-id=414 bgcolor=#E9E9E9
| 456414 ||  || — || September 27, 2006 || Mount Lemmon || Mount Lemmon Survey || — || align=right | 1.5 km || 
|-id=415 bgcolor=#E9E9E9
| 456415 ||  || — || October 28, 2006 || Kitt Peak || Spacewatch || — || align=right | 1.3 km || 
|-id=416 bgcolor=#E9E9E9
| 456416 ||  || — || October 16, 2006 || Kitt Peak || Spacewatch || KON || align=right | 2.1 km || 
|-id=417 bgcolor=#E9E9E9
| 456417 ||  || — || October 19, 2006 || Mount Lemmon || Mount Lemmon Survey || — || align=right | 1.2 km || 
|-id=418 bgcolor=#fefefe
| 456418 ||  || — || September 14, 2006 || Kitt Peak || Spacewatch || — || align=right | 1.1 km || 
|-id=419 bgcolor=#E9E9E9
| 456419 ||  || — || October 19, 2006 || Mount Lemmon || Mount Lemmon Survey || — || align=right | 1.2 km || 
|-id=420 bgcolor=#E9E9E9
| 456420 ||  || — || October 23, 2006 || Mount Lemmon || Mount Lemmon Survey || — || align=right | 2.4 km || 
|-id=421 bgcolor=#E9E9E9
| 456421 ||  || — || October 20, 2006 || Kitt Peak || Spacewatch || — || align=right | 1.1 km || 
|-id=422 bgcolor=#fefefe
| 456422 ||  || — || September 25, 2006 || Mount Lemmon || Mount Lemmon Survey || — || align=right | 1.0 km || 
|-id=423 bgcolor=#E9E9E9
| 456423 ||  || — || October 22, 2006 || Mount Lemmon || Mount Lemmon Survey || — || align=right | 1.5 km || 
|-id=424 bgcolor=#E9E9E9
| 456424 ||  || — || October 3, 2006 || Mount Lemmon || Mount Lemmon Survey || — || align=right | 1.4 km || 
|-id=425 bgcolor=#E9E9E9
| 456425 ||  || — || November 11, 2006 || Mount Lemmon || Mount Lemmon Survey || — || align=right | 1.1 km || 
|-id=426 bgcolor=#E9E9E9
| 456426 ||  || — || September 30, 2006 || Mount Lemmon || Mount Lemmon Survey || — || align=right | 1.1 km || 
|-id=427 bgcolor=#E9E9E9
| 456427 ||  || — || October 21, 2006 || Kitt Peak || Spacewatch || — || align=right | 1.3 km || 
|-id=428 bgcolor=#E9E9E9
| 456428 ||  || — || October 13, 2006 || Kitt Peak || Spacewatch || — || align=right | 1.2 km || 
|-id=429 bgcolor=#E9E9E9
| 456429 ||  || — || November 10, 2006 || Kitt Peak || Spacewatch || — || align=right | 1.4 km || 
|-id=430 bgcolor=#E9E9E9
| 456430 ||  || — || October 21, 2006 || Kitt Peak || Spacewatch || — || align=right | 1.3 km || 
|-id=431 bgcolor=#E9E9E9
| 456431 ||  || — || November 10, 2006 || Kitt Peak || Spacewatch || — || align=right | 1.4 km || 
|-id=432 bgcolor=#E9E9E9
| 456432 ||  || — || October 19, 2006 || Mount Lemmon || Mount Lemmon Survey || EUN || align=right | 1.1 km || 
|-id=433 bgcolor=#E9E9E9
| 456433 ||  || — || November 10, 2006 || Kitt Peak || Spacewatch || — || align=right | 1.6 km || 
|-id=434 bgcolor=#E9E9E9
| 456434 ||  || — || November 10, 2006 || Kitt Peak || Spacewatch || — || align=right | 2.4 km || 
|-id=435 bgcolor=#E9E9E9
| 456435 ||  || — || November 11, 2006 || Kitt Peak || Spacewatch || — || align=right | 1.4 km || 
|-id=436 bgcolor=#E9E9E9
| 456436 ||  || — || November 11, 2006 || Mount Lemmon || Mount Lemmon Survey || — || align=right data-sort-value="0.74" | 740 m || 
|-id=437 bgcolor=#E9E9E9
| 456437 ||  || — || September 28, 2006 || Mount Lemmon || Mount Lemmon Survey || — || align=right | 1.5 km || 
|-id=438 bgcolor=#E9E9E9
| 456438 ||  || — || November 1, 2006 || Mount Lemmon || Mount Lemmon Survey || MIScritical || align=right | 1.7 km || 
|-id=439 bgcolor=#E9E9E9
| 456439 ||  || — || November 9, 2006 || Kitt Peak || Spacewatch || — || align=right | 1.1 km || 
|-id=440 bgcolor=#E9E9E9
| 456440 ||  || — || November 11, 2006 || Kitt Peak || Spacewatch || — || align=right data-sort-value="0.79" | 790 m || 
|-id=441 bgcolor=#E9E9E9
| 456441 ||  || — || November 11, 2006 || Kitt Peak || Spacewatch || — || align=right | 1.9 km || 
|-id=442 bgcolor=#E9E9E9
| 456442 ||  || — || November 11, 2006 || Kitt Peak || Spacewatch || DOR || align=right | 2.0 km || 
|-id=443 bgcolor=#E9E9E9
| 456443 ||  || — || October 2, 2006 || Mount Lemmon || Mount Lemmon Survey || — || align=right | 2.1 km || 
|-id=444 bgcolor=#E9E9E9
| 456444 ||  || — || November 11, 2006 || Kitt Peak || Spacewatch || MIS || align=right | 1.5 km || 
|-id=445 bgcolor=#E9E9E9
| 456445 ||  || — || November 12, 2006 || Mount Lemmon || Mount Lemmon Survey || (5) || align=right data-sort-value="0.72" | 720 m || 
|-id=446 bgcolor=#E9E9E9
| 456446 ||  || — || October 29, 2006 || Catalina || CSS || — || align=right | 1.2 km || 
|-id=447 bgcolor=#E9E9E9
| 456447 ||  || — || October 31, 2006 || Kitt Peak || Spacewatch || — || align=right | 2.4 km || 
|-id=448 bgcolor=#E9E9E9
| 456448 ||  || — || September 27, 2006 || Mount Lemmon || Mount Lemmon Survey || — || align=right | 1.2 km || 
|-id=449 bgcolor=#E9E9E9
| 456449 ||  || — || November 11, 2006 || Kitt Peak || Spacewatch || — || align=right | 1.2 km || 
|-id=450 bgcolor=#E9E9E9
| 456450 ||  || — || November 11, 2006 || Palomar || NEAT || — || align=right | 1.1 km || 
|-id=451 bgcolor=#E9E9E9
| 456451 ||  || — || November 12, 2006 || Mount Lemmon || Mount Lemmon Survey || — || align=right data-sort-value="0.82" | 820 m || 
|-id=452 bgcolor=#E9E9E9
| 456452 ||  || — || October 4, 2006 || Mount Lemmon || Mount Lemmon Survey || (5) || align=right data-sort-value="0.77" | 770 m || 
|-id=453 bgcolor=#E9E9E9
| 456453 ||  || — || November 13, 2006 || Kitt Peak || Spacewatch || — || align=right | 1.1 km || 
|-id=454 bgcolor=#E9E9E9
| 456454 ||  || — || September 19, 2006 || Catalina || CSS || — || align=right | 1.7 km || 
|-id=455 bgcolor=#E9E9E9
| 456455 ||  || — || November 13, 2006 || Palomar || NEAT || — || align=right | 3.1 km || 
|-id=456 bgcolor=#E9E9E9
| 456456 ||  || — || November 10, 2006 || Kitt Peak || Spacewatch || — || align=right | 3.6 km || 
|-id=457 bgcolor=#E9E9E9
| 456457 ||  || — || November 14, 2006 || Kitt Peak || Spacewatch || (1547) || align=right | 1.4 km || 
|-id=458 bgcolor=#E9E9E9
| 456458 ||  || — || November 15, 2006 || Kitt Peak || Spacewatch || — || align=right | 2.1 km || 
|-id=459 bgcolor=#E9E9E9
| 456459 ||  || — || November 15, 2006 || Kitt Peak || Spacewatch || — || align=right | 1.2 km || 
|-id=460 bgcolor=#E9E9E9
| 456460 ||  || — || November 15, 2006 || Kitt Peak || Spacewatch || — || align=right | 1.4 km || 
|-id=461 bgcolor=#E9E9E9
| 456461 ||  || — || October 22, 2006 || Mount Lemmon || Mount Lemmon Survey || — || align=right | 1.8 km || 
|-id=462 bgcolor=#E9E9E9
| 456462 ||  || — || November 15, 2006 || Kitt Peak || Spacewatch || — || align=right | 1.1 km || 
|-id=463 bgcolor=#E9E9E9
| 456463 ||  || — || August 24, 2001 || Kitt Peak || Spacewatch || — || align=right | 1.7 km || 
|-id=464 bgcolor=#E9E9E9
| 456464 ||  || — || November 15, 2006 || Kitt Peak || Spacewatch || — || align=right | 1.2 km || 
|-id=465 bgcolor=#E9E9E9
| 456465 ||  || — || November 15, 2006 || Kitt Peak || Spacewatch || — || align=right | 1.9 km || 
|-id=466 bgcolor=#E9E9E9
| 456466 ||  || — || November 11, 2006 || Mount Lemmon || Mount Lemmon Survey || — || align=right | 1.6 km || 
|-id=467 bgcolor=#E9E9E9
| 456467 ||  || — || November 16, 2006 || Kitt Peak || Spacewatch || (5) || align=right data-sort-value="0.70" | 700 m || 
|-id=468 bgcolor=#E9E9E9
| 456468 ||  || — || November 16, 2006 || Kitt Peak || Spacewatch || — || align=right | 1.3 km || 
|-id=469 bgcolor=#E9E9E9
| 456469 ||  || — || September 26, 2006 || Mount Lemmon || Mount Lemmon Survey || — || align=right | 1.2 km || 
|-id=470 bgcolor=#E9E9E9
| 456470 ||  || — || October 3, 2006 || Mount Lemmon || Mount Lemmon Survey || AEO || align=right data-sort-value="0.84" | 840 m || 
|-id=471 bgcolor=#E9E9E9
| 456471 ||  || — || September 27, 2006 || Mount Lemmon || Mount Lemmon Survey || critical || align=right | 1.4 km || 
|-id=472 bgcolor=#E9E9E9
| 456472 ||  || — || November 16, 2006 || Kitt Peak || Spacewatch || critical || align=right | 1.1 km || 
|-id=473 bgcolor=#fefefe
| 456473 ||  || — || October 2, 2006 || Mount Lemmon || Mount Lemmon Survey || — || align=right data-sort-value="0.72" | 720 m || 
|-id=474 bgcolor=#E9E9E9
| 456474 ||  || — || October 21, 2006 || Kitt Peak || Spacewatch || — || align=right data-sort-value="0.94" | 940 m || 
|-id=475 bgcolor=#E9E9E9
| 456475 ||  || — || November 17, 2006 || Catalina || CSS || — || align=right | 1.6 km || 
|-id=476 bgcolor=#d6d6d6
| 456476 ||  || — || November 17, 2006 || Mount Lemmon || Mount Lemmon Survey || 3:2 || align=right | 5.1 km || 
|-id=477 bgcolor=#E9E9E9
| 456477 ||  || — || November 18, 2006 || Kitt Peak || Spacewatch || — || align=right | 1.1 km || 
|-id=478 bgcolor=#E9E9E9
| 456478 ||  || — || November 18, 2006 || Kitt Peak || Spacewatch || (5) || align=right data-sort-value="0.63" | 630 m || 
|-id=479 bgcolor=#E9E9E9
| 456479 ||  || — || November 18, 2006 || Kitt Peak || Spacewatch || — || align=right | 1.9 km || 
|-id=480 bgcolor=#d6d6d6
| 456480 ||  || — || August 30, 2005 || Kitt Peak || Spacewatch || 3:2 || align=right | 3.4 km || 
|-id=481 bgcolor=#E9E9E9
| 456481 ||  || — || November 19, 2006 || Kitt Peak || Spacewatch || — || align=right data-sort-value="0.96" | 960 m || 
|-id=482 bgcolor=#E9E9E9
| 456482 ||  || — || October 23, 2006 || Mount Lemmon || Mount Lemmon Survey || — || align=right | 2.1 km || 
|-id=483 bgcolor=#E9E9E9
| 456483 ||  || — || November 19, 2006 || Kitt Peak || Spacewatch || — || align=right | 1.3 km || 
|-id=484 bgcolor=#E9E9E9
| 456484 ||  || — || November 20, 2006 || Kitt Peak || Spacewatch || — || align=right | 1.1 km || 
|-id=485 bgcolor=#E9E9E9
| 456485 ||  || — || October 27, 2006 || Kitt Peak || Spacewatch || — || align=right | 1.2 km || 
|-id=486 bgcolor=#E9E9E9
| 456486 ||  || — || November 22, 2006 || Mount Lemmon || Mount Lemmon Survey || — || align=right | 1.4 km || 
|-id=487 bgcolor=#E9E9E9
| 456487 ||  || — || November 10, 2006 || Kitt Peak || Spacewatch || — || align=right data-sort-value="0.76" | 760 m || 
|-id=488 bgcolor=#E9E9E9
| 456488 ||  || — || November 19, 2006 || Socorro || LINEAR || — || align=right | 2.3 km || 
|-id=489 bgcolor=#E9E9E9
| 456489 ||  || — || October 30, 2006 || Catalina || CSS || — || align=right | 1.4 km || 
|-id=490 bgcolor=#E9E9E9
| 456490 ||  || — || November 20, 2006 || Kitt Peak || Spacewatch || — || align=right | 1.3 km || 
|-id=491 bgcolor=#E9E9E9
| 456491 ||  || — || November 15, 2006 || Catalina || CSS || — || align=right | 1.8 km || 
|-id=492 bgcolor=#E9E9E9
| 456492 ||  || — || November 21, 2006 || Mount Lemmon || Mount Lemmon Survey || — || align=right | 2.0 km || 
|-id=493 bgcolor=#E9E9E9
| 456493 ||  || — || November 22, 2006 || Mount Lemmon || Mount Lemmon Survey || — || align=right | 1.3 km || 
|-id=494 bgcolor=#E9E9E9
| 456494 ||  || — || November 22, 2006 || Mount Lemmon || Mount Lemmon Survey || EUN || align=right | 1.5 km || 
|-id=495 bgcolor=#E9E9E9
| 456495 ||  || — || November 1, 2006 || Mount Lemmon || Mount Lemmon Survey || — || align=right | 1.1 km || 
|-id=496 bgcolor=#E9E9E9
| 456496 ||  || — || November 24, 2006 || Mount Lemmon || Mount Lemmon Survey || — || align=right | 1.6 km || 
|-id=497 bgcolor=#E9E9E9
| 456497 ||  || — || November 24, 2006 || Mount Lemmon || Mount Lemmon Survey || — || align=right | 1.6 km || 
|-id=498 bgcolor=#E9E9E9
| 456498 ||  || — || November 24, 2006 || Mount Lemmon || Mount Lemmon Survey || — || align=right | 2.5 km || 
|-id=499 bgcolor=#E9E9E9
| 456499 ||  || — || November 2, 2006 || Mount Lemmon || Mount Lemmon Survey || — || align=right | 1.6 km || 
|-id=500 bgcolor=#E9E9E9
| 456500 ||  || — || October 31, 2006 || Mount Lemmon || Mount Lemmon Survey || EUN || align=right | 1.2 km || 
|}

456501–456600 

|-bgcolor=#E9E9E9
| 456501 ||  || — || November 17, 2006 || Mount Lemmon || Mount Lemmon Survey || — || align=right | 1.2 km || 
|-id=502 bgcolor=#E9E9E9
| 456502 ||  || — || November 16, 2006 || Kitt Peak || Spacewatch || — || align=right | 1.6 km || 
|-id=503 bgcolor=#E9E9E9
| 456503 ||  || — || November 25, 2006 || Mount Lemmon || Mount Lemmon Survey || — || align=right data-sort-value="0.99" | 990 m || 
|-id=504 bgcolor=#E9E9E9
| 456504 ||  || — || November 18, 2006 || Kitt Peak || Spacewatch || — || align=right data-sort-value="0.98" | 980 m || 
|-id=505 bgcolor=#E9E9E9
| 456505 ||  || — || December 10, 2006 || Kitt Peak || Spacewatch || (1547) || align=right | 1.5 km || 
|-id=506 bgcolor=#E9E9E9
| 456506 ||  || — || December 12, 2006 || Kitt Peak || Spacewatch || EUN || align=right | 1.4 km || 
|-id=507 bgcolor=#E9E9E9
| 456507 ||  || — || December 13, 2006 || Mount Lemmon || Mount Lemmon Survey || — || align=right | 1.4 km || 
|-id=508 bgcolor=#E9E9E9
| 456508 ||  || — || December 13, 2006 || Mount Lemmon || Mount Lemmon Survey || — || align=right | 1.9 km || 
|-id=509 bgcolor=#E9E9E9
| 456509 ||  || — || December 11, 2006 || Kitt Peak || Spacewatch || — || align=right | 2.0 km || 
|-id=510 bgcolor=#E9E9E9
| 456510 ||  || — || November 19, 2006 || Catalina || CSS || JUN || align=right | 1.0 km || 
|-id=511 bgcolor=#E9E9E9
| 456511 ||  || — || December 14, 2006 || Mount Lemmon || Mount Lemmon Survey || — || align=right | 1.8 km || 
|-id=512 bgcolor=#E9E9E9
| 456512 ||  || — || November 25, 2006 || Mount Lemmon || Mount Lemmon Survey || — || align=right | 1.7 km || 
|-id=513 bgcolor=#E9E9E9
| 456513 ||  || — || December 12, 2006 || Palomar || NEAT || — || align=right | 1.8 km || 
|-id=514 bgcolor=#E9E9E9
| 456514 ||  || — || December 1, 2006 || Mount Lemmon || Mount Lemmon Survey || — || align=right | 1.3 km || 
|-id=515 bgcolor=#E9E9E9
| 456515 ||  || — || December 15, 2006 || Kitt Peak || Spacewatch || DOR || align=right | 2.2 km || 
|-id=516 bgcolor=#E9E9E9
| 456516 ||  || — || November 27, 2006 || Mount Lemmon || Mount Lemmon Survey || MRX || align=right | 1.0 km || 
|-id=517 bgcolor=#E9E9E9
| 456517 ||  || — || December 24, 2006 || Mount Lemmon || Mount Lemmon Survey || EUN || align=right | 1.1 km || 
|-id=518 bgcolor=#E9E9E9
| 456518 ||  || — || October 21, 2006 || Kitt Peak || Spacewatch || — || align=right | 2.2 km || 
|-id=519 bgcolor=#E9E9E9
| 456519 ||  || — || December 21, 2006 || Kitt Peak || Spacewatch || — || align=right | 1.3 km || 
|-id=520 bgcolor=#E9E9E9
| 456520 ||  || — || August 31, 2005 || Anderson Mesa || LONEOS || — || align=right | 2.1 km || 
|-id=521 bgcolor=#E9E9E9
| 456521 ||  || — || December 15, 2006 || Kitt Peak || Spacewatch || — || align=right | 2.3 km || 
|-id=522 bgcolor=#E9E9E9
| 456522 ||  || — || August 29, 2005 || Kitt Peak || Spacewatch || — || align=right | 2.2 km || 
|-id=523 bgcolor=#E9E9E9
| 456523 ||  || — || December 16, 2006 || Catalina || CSS || — || align=right | 1.9 km || 
|-id=524 bgcolor=#E9E9E9
| 456524 ||  || — || November 17, 2006 || Mount Lemmon || Mount Lemmon Survey || — || align=right | 1.7 km || 
|-id=525 bgcolor=#E9E9E9
| 456525 ||  || — || December 26, 2006 || Kitt Peak || Spacewatch || — || align=right | 1.3 km || 
|-id=526 bgcolor=#E9E9E9
| 456526 ||  || — || December 27, 2006 || Mount Lemmon || Mount Lemmon Survey || — || align=right | 1.5 km || 
|-id=527 bgcolor=#E9E9E9
| 456527 ||  || — || December 20, 2006 || Mount Lemmon || Mount Lemmon Survey || — || align=right | 2.4 km || 
|-id=528 bgcolor=#E9E9E9
| 456528 ||  || — || December 24, 2006 || Kitt Peak || Spacewatch || — || align=right | 2.6 km || 
|-id=529 bgcolor=#E9E9E9
| 456529 ||  || — || January 10, 2007 || Kitt Peak || Spacewatch || — || align=right | 1.2 km || 
|-id=530 bgcolor=#E9E9E9
| 456530 ||  || — || November 28, 2006 || Mount Lemmon || Mount Lemmon Survey || — || align=right | 1.9 km || 
|-id=531 bgcolor=#E9E9E9
| 456531 ||  || — || November 25, 2006 || Mount Lemmon || Mount Lemmon Survey || — || align=right | 1.9 km || 
|-id=532 bgcolor=#E9E9E9
| 456532 ||  || — || November 28, 2006 || Mount Lemmon || Mount Lemmon Survey || — || align=right | 2.0 km || 
|-id=533 bgcolor=#E9E9E9
| 456533 ||  || — || January 9, 2007 || Kitt Peak || Spacewatch || — || align=right | 1.5 km || 
|-id=534 bgcolor=#E9E9E9
| 456534 ||  || — || January 10, 2007 || Mount Lemmon || Mount Lemmon Survey || — || align=right | 2.0 km || 
|-id=535 bgcolor=#E9E9E9
| 456535 ||  || — || January 10, 2007 || Mount Lemmon || Mount Lemmon Survey || DOR || align=right | 2.7 km || 
|-id=536 bgcolor=#FFC2E0
| 456536 ||  || — || January 16, 2007 || Catalina || CSS || AMO || align=right data-sort-value="0.58" | 580 m || 
|-id=537 bgcolor=#FFC2E0
| 456537 ||  || — || January 18, 2007 || Siding Spring || SSS || ATE || align=right data-sort-value="0.31" | 310 m || 
|-id=538 bgcolor=#E9E9E9
| 456538 ||  || — || December 13, 2006 || Kitt Peak || Spacewatch || — || align=right | 1.3 km || 
|-id=539 bgcolor=#E9E9E9
| 456539 ||  || — || January 9, 2007 || Kitt Peak || Spacewatch || EUN || align=right | 1.3 km || 
|-id=540 bgcolor=#E9E9E9
| 456540 ||  || — || January 17, 2007 || Palomar || NEAT || EUN || align=right | 1.3 km || 
|-id=541 bgcolor=#E9E9E9
| 456541 ||  || — || November 15, 2006 || Mount Lemmon || Mount Lemmon Survey || — || align=right | 2.5 km || 
|-id=542 bgcolor=#E9E9E9
| 456542 ||  || — || January 17, 2007 || Kitt Peak || Spacewatch || — || align=right | 2.0 km || 
|-id=543 bgcolor=#E9E9E9
| 456543 ||  || — || January 17, 2007 || Kitt Peak || Spacewatch || — || align=right | 2.3 km || 
|-id=544 bgcolor=#E9E9E9
| 456544 ||  || — || January 10, 2007 || Catalina || CSS || — || align=right | 1.6 km || 
|-id=545 bgcolor=#E9E9E9
| 456545 ||  || — || January 9, 2007 || Kitt Peak || Spacewatch || — || align=right | 2.8 km || 
|-id=546 bgcolor=#d6d6d6
| 456546 ||  || — || January 9, 2007 || Mount Lemmon || Mount Lemmon Survey || — || align=right | 2.0 km || 
|-id=547 bgcolor=#E9E9E9
| 456547 ||  || — || January 24, 2007 || Mount Lemmon || Mount Lemmon Survey || — || align=right | 1.5 km || 
|-id=548 bgcolor=#E9E9E9
| 456548 ||  || — || January 9, 2007 || Kitt Peak || Spacewatch || — || align=right | 2.3 km || 
|-id=549 bgcolor=#d6d6d6
| 456549 ||  || — || January 17, 2007 || Kitt Peak || Spacewatch || — || align=right | 3.0 km || 
|-id=550 bgcolor=#E9E9E9
| 456550 ||  || — || January 17, 2007 || Kitt Peak || Spacewatch || — || align=right | 1.4 km || 
|-id=551 bgcolor=#E9E9E9
| 456551 ||  || — || November 17, 2006 || Mount Lemmon || Mount Lemmon Survey || — || align=right | 2.0 km || 
|-id=552 bgcolor=#E9E9E9
| 456552 ||  || — || January 24, 2007 || Socorro || LINEAR || — || align=right | 2.7 km || 
|-id=553 bgcolor=#E9E9E9
| 456553 ||  || — || December 24, 2006 || Mount Lemmon || Mount Lemmon Survey || — || align=right | 2.0 km || 
|-id=554 bgcolor=#E9E9E9
| 456554 ||  || — || January 27, 2007 || Mount Lemmon || Mount Lemmon Survey || — || align=right | 1.1 km || 
|-id=555 bgcolor=#E9E9E9
| 456555 ||  || — || January 27, 2007 || Catalina || CSS || — || align=right | 3.1 km || 
|-id=556 bgcolor=#E9E9E9
| 456556 ||  || — || December 21, 2006 || Mount Lemmon || Mount Lemmon Survey || — || align=right | 1.9 km || 
|-id=557 bgcolor=#E9E9E9
| 456557 ||  || — || January 17, 2007 || Kitt Peak || Spacewatch || — || align=right | 1.9 km || 
|-id=558 bgcolor=#E9E9E9
| 456558 ||  || — || January 17, 2007 || Kitt Peak || Spacewatch || WIT || align=right data-sort-value="0.82" | 820 m || 
|-id=559 bgcolor=#E9E9E9
| 456559 ||  || — || January 27, 2007 || Mount Lemmon || Mount Lemmon Survey || GEF || align=right | 1.5 km || 
|-id=560 bgcolor=#E9E9E9
| 456560 ||  || — || January 8, 2007 || Kitt Peak || Spacewatch || MAR || align=right | 1.1 km || 
|-id=561 bgcolor=#FA8072
| 456561 ||  || — || February 6, 2007 || Kitt Peak || Spacewatch || — || align=right | 1.5 km || 
|-id=562 bgcolor=#E9E9E9
| 456562 ||  || — || February 6, 2007 || Kitt Peak || Spacewatch || EUN || align=right | 1.7 km || 
|-id=563 bgcolor=#E9E9E9
| 456563 ||  || — || February 7, 2007 || Mount Lemmon || Mount Lemmon Survey || — || align=right | 1.9 km || 
|-id=564 bgcolor=#E9E9E9
| 456564 ||  || — || January 8, 2007 || Mount Lemmon || Mount Lemmon Survey || ADE || align=right | 1.9 km || 
|-id=565 bgcolor=#E9E9E9
| 456565 ||  || — || February 6, 2007 || Mount Lemmon || Mount Lemmon Survey || — || align=right | 1.4 km || 
|-id=566 bgcolor=#E9E9E9
| 456566 ||  || — || December 21, 2006 || Mount Lemmon || Mount Lemmon Survey || — || align=right | 2.6 km || 
|-id=567 bgcolor=#E9E9E9
| 456567 ||  || — || January 25, 2007 || Kitt Peak || Spacewatch || — || align=right | 2.7 km || 
|-id=568 bgcolor=#E9E9E9
| 456568 ||  || — || October 1, 2005 || Kitt Peak || Spacewatch || — || align=right | 1.4 km || 
|-id=569 bgcolor=#E9E9E9
| 456569 ||  || — || January 27, 2007 || Kitt Peak || Spacewatch || — || align=right | 2.1 km || 
|-id=570 bgcolor=#E9E9E9
| 456570 ||  || — || January 25, 2007 || Kitt Peak || Spacewatch || — || align=right | 1.4 km || 
|-id=571 bgcolor=#E9E9E9
| 456571 ||  || — || February 16, 2007 || Mount Lemmon || Mount Lemmon Survey || — || align=right | 1.9 km || 
|-id=572 bgcolor=#E9E9E9
| 456572 ||  || — || January 17, 2007 || Kitt Peak || Spacewatch || — || align=right | 2.4 km || 
|-id=573 bgcolor=#E9E9E9
| 456573 ||  || — || February 17, 2007 || Kitt Peak || Spacewatch || — || align=right | 1.9 km || 
|-id=574 bgcolor=#d6d6d6
| 456574 ||  || — || February 17, 2007 || Kitt Peak || Spacewatch || KOR || align=right | 1.2 km || 
|-id=575 bgcolor=#E9E9E9
| 456575 ||  || — || February 17, 2007 || Kitt Peak || Spacewatch || — || align=right | 1.8 km || 
|-id=576 bgcolor=#E9E9E9
| 456576 ||  || — || February 17, 2007 || Kitt Peak || Spacewatch || — || align=right | 2.0 km || 
|-id=577 bgcolor=#E9E9E9
| 456577 ||  || — || February 17, 2007 || Kitt Peak || Spacewatch || — || align=right | 1.2 km || 
|-id=578 bgcolor=#E9E9E9
| 456578 ||  || — || February 17, 2007 || Kitt Peak || Spacewatch || — || align=right | 2.1 km || 
|-id=579 bgcolor=#E9E9E9
| 456579 ||  || — || February 17, 2007 || Kitt Peak || Spacewatch || — || align=right | 1.4 km || 
|-id=580 bgcolor=#d6d6d6
| 456580 ||  || — || December 27, 2006 || Mount Lemmon || Mount Lemmon Survey || — || align=right | 2.5 km || 
|-id=581 bgcolor=#E9E9E9
| 456581 ||  || — || February 17, 2007 || Kitt Peak || Spacewatch || — || align=right | 2.4 km || 
|-id=582 bgcolor=#E9E9E9
| 456582 ||  || — || February 17, 2007 || Kitt Peak || Spacewatch || — || align=right | 2.0 km || 
|-id=583 bgcolor=#E9E9E9
| 456583 ||  || — || February 17, 2007 || Kitt Peak || Spacewatch || — || align=right | 1.9 km || 
|-id=584 bgcolor=#E9E9E9
| 456584 ||  || — || February 16, 2007 || Catalina || CSS || — || align=right | 2.1 km || 
|-id=585 bgcolor=#E9E9E9
| 456585 ||  || — || February 17, 2007 || Socorro || LINEAR || — || align=right | 3.1 km || 
|-id=586 bgcolor=#d6d6d6
| 456586 ||  || — || February 21, 2007 || Kitt Peak || Spacewatch || KOR || align=right | 1.4 km || 
|-id=587 bgcolor=#E9E9E9
| 456587 ||  || — || February 9, 2007 || Kitt Peak || Spacewatch || — || align=right | 2.3 km || 
|-id=588 bgcolor=#E9E9E9
| 456588 ||  || — || February 17, 2007 || Catalina || CSS || — || align=right | 1.6 km || 
|-id=589 bgcolor=#E9E9E9
| 456589 ||  || — || February 22, 2007 || Anderson Mesa || LONEOS || EUN || align=right | 1.6 km || 
|-id=590 bgcolor=#E9E9E9
| 456590 ||  || — || January 17, 2007 || Mount Lemmon || Mount Lemmon Survey || — || align=right | 1.6 km || 
|-id=591 bgcolor=#E9E9E9
| 456591 ||  || — || February 9, 2007 || Kitt Peak || Spacewatch || GEF || align=right | 1.1 km || 
|-id=592 bgcolor=#E9E9E9
| 456592 ||  || — || February 21, 2007 || Mount Lemmon || Mount Lemmon Survey || — || align=right | 1.9 km || 
|-id=593 bgcolor=#E9E9E9
| 456593 ||  || — || March 9, 2007 || Mount Lemmon || Mount Lemmon Survey || — || align=right | 1.5 km || 
|-id=594 bgcolor=#E9E9E9
| 456594 ||  || — || March 10, 2007 || Mount Lemmon || Mount Lemmon Survey || — || align=right | 2.0 km || 
|-id=595 bgcolor=#E9E9E9
| 456595 ||  || — || February 17, 2007 || Mount Lemmon || Mount Lemmon Survey || — || align=right | 2.3 km || 
|-id=596 bgcolor=#E9E9E9
| 456596 ||  || — || March 10, 2007 || Kitt Peak || Spacewatch || — || align=right | 2.5 km || 
|-id=597 bgcolor=#E9E9E9
| 456597 ||  || — || March 11, 2007 || Anderson Mesa || LONEOS || — || align=right | 2.0 km || 
|-id=598 bgcolor=#E9E9E9
| 456598 ||  || — || March 11, 2007 || Mount Lemmon || Mount Lemmon Survey || DOR || align=right | 1.7 km || 
|-id=599 bgcolor=#E9E9E9
| 456599 ||  || — || January 27, 2007 || Mount Lemmon || Mount Lemmon Survey || — || align=right | 1.5 km || 
|-id=600 bgcolor=#E9E9E9
| 456600 ||  || — || March 12, 2007 || Mount Lemmon || Mount Lemmon Survey || — || align=right | 1.8 km || 
|}

456601–456700 

|-bgcolor=#E9E9E9
| 456601 ||  || — || March 12, 2007 || Mount Lemmon || Mount Lemmon Survey || — || align=right | 2.6 km || 
|-id=602 bgcolor=#E9E9E9
| 456602 ||  || — || March 12, 2007 || Kitt Peak || Spacewatch || — || align=right | 2.5 km || 
|-id=603 bgcolor=#E9E9E9
| 456603 ||  || — || March 12, 2007 || Kitt Peak || Spacewatch || — || align=right | 2.7 km || 
|-id=604 bgcolor=#E9E9E9
| 456604 ||  || — || March 15, 2007 || Kitt Peak || Spacewatch || — || align=right | 2.1 km || 
|-id=605 bgcolor=#E9E9E9
| 456605 ||  || — || February 23, 2007 || Kitt Peak || Spacewatch || — || align=right | 2.1 km || 
|-id=606 bgcolor=#E9E9E9
| 456606 ||  || — || March 13, 2007 || Kitt Peak || Spacewatch || — || align=right | 2.3 km || 
|-id=607 bgcolor=#E9E9E9
| 456607 ||  || — || March 11, 2007 || Catalina || CSS || — || align=right | 2.3 km || 
|-id=608 bgcolor=#d6d6d6
| 456608 ||  || — || March 9, 2007 || Kitt Peak || Spacewatch || KOR || align=right | 1.3 km || 
|-id=609 bgcolor=#d6d6d6
| 456609 ||  || — || March 16, 2007 || Catalina || CSS || — || align=right | 3.7 km || 
|-id=610 bgcolor=#E9E9E9
| 456610 ||  || — || March 28, 2007 || Socorro || LINEAR || — || align=right | 2.3 km || 
|-id=611 bgcolor=#E9E9E9
| 456611 ||  || — || March 11, 2007 || Kitt Peak || Spacewatch || — || align=right | 2.7 km || 
|-id=612 bgcolor=#E9E9E9
| 456612 ||  || — || April 11, 2007 || Kitt Peak || Spacewatch || — || align=right | 2.2 km || 
|-id=613 bgcolor=#E9E9E9
| 456613 ||  || — || March 16, 2007 || Mount Lemmon || Mount Lemmon Survey || — || align=right | 2.3 km || 
|-id=614 bgcolor=#d6d6d6
| 456614 ||  || — || April 14, 2007 || Kitt Peak || Spacewatch || — || align=right | 2.5 km || 
|-id=615 bgcolor=#d6d6d6
| 456615 ||  || — || April 15, 2007 || Kitt Peak || Spacewatch || — || align=right | 3.4 km || 
|-id=616 bgcolor=#E9E9E9
| 456616 ||  || — || March 26, 2007 || Kitt Peak || Spacewatch || — || align=right | 1.9 km || 
|-id=617 bgcolor=#d6d6d6
| 456617 ||  || — || April 14, 2007 || Kitt Peak || Spacewatch || — || align=right | 2.5 km || 
|-id=618 bgcolor=#FFC2E0
| 456618 ||  || — || April 16, 2007 || Mount Lemmon || Mount Lemmon Survey || AMO || align=right data-sort-value="0.43" | 430 m || 
|-id=619 bgcolor=#E9E9E9
| 456619 ||  || — || April 16, 2007 || Catalina || CSS || — || align=right | 2.3 km || 
|-id=620 bgcolor=#d6d6d6
| 456620 ||  || — || April 20, 2007 || Kitt Peak || Spacewatch || — || align=right | 2.4 km || 
|-id=621 bgcolor=#d6d6d6
| 456621 ||  || — || April 20, 2007 || Mount Lemmon || Mount Lemmon Survey || — || align=right | 3.2 km || 
|-id=622 bgcolor=#d6d6d6
| 456622 ||  || — || March 25, 2007 || Mount Lemmon || Mount Lemmon Survey || THM || align=right | 2.2 km || 
|-id=623 bgcolor=#d6d6d6
| 456623 ||  || — || April 14, 2007 || Kitt Peak || Spacewatch || — || align=right | 3.1 km || 
|-id=624 bgcolor=#d6d6d6
| 456624 ||  || — || April 18, 2007 || Mount Lemmon || Mount Lemmon Survey || — || align=right | 2.9 km || 
|-id=625 bgcolor=#d6d6d6
| 456625 ||  || — || April 11, 2007 || Kitt Peak || Spacewatch || — || align=right | 3.1 km || 
|-id=626 bgcolor=#d6d6d6
| 456626 ||  || — || May 9, 2007 || Kitt Peak || Spacewatch || VER || align=right | 2.5 km || 
|-id=627 bgcolor=#E9E9E9
| 456627 Cristianmartins ||  ||  || May 21, 2007 || Antares || ARO || GEF || align=right | 1.2 km || 
|-id=628 bgcolor=#d6d6d6
| 456628 ||  || — || June 10, 2007 || Kitt Peak || Spacewatch || EOS || align=right | 2.2 km || 
|-id=629 bgcolor=#d6d6d6
| 456629 ||  || — || April 24, 2007 || Mount Lemmon || Mount Lemmon Survey || — || align=right | 3.1 km || 
|-id=630 bgcolor=#d6d6d6
| 456630 ||  || — || June 10, 2007 || Catalina || CSS || — || align=right | 4.3 km || 
|-id=631 bgcolor=#fefefe
| 456631 ||  || — || August 9, 2007 || Socorro || LINEAR || — || align=right data-sort-value="0.85" | 850 m || 
|-id=632 bgcolor=#d6d6d6
| 456632 ||  || — || August 8, 2007 || Socorro || LINEAR || — || align=right | 3.3 km || 
|-id=633 bgcolor=#fefefe
| 456633 ||  || — || July 19, 2007 || Mount Lemmon || Mount Lemmon Survey || — || align=right data-sort-value="0.96" | 960 m || 
|-id=634 bgcolor=#fefefe
| 456634 ||  || — || August 10, 2007 || Reedy Creek || J. Broughton || — || align=right data-sort-value="0.90" | 900 m || 
|-id=635 bgcolor=#fefefe
| 456635 ||  || — || August 13, 2007 || Socorro || LINEAR || — || align=right | 2.1 km || 
|-id=636 bgcolor=#fefefe
| 456636 ||  || — || April 7, 2006 || Kitt Peak || Spacewatch || — || align=right | 1.5 km || 
|-id=637 bgcolor=#fefefe
| 456637 ||  || — || August 10, 2007 || Siding Spring || SSS || — || align=right | 1.2 km || 
|-id=638 bgcolor=#fefefe
| 456638 ||  || — || August 21, 2007 || Anderson Mesa || LONEOS || — || align=right data-sort-value="0.85" | 850 m || 
|-id=639 bgcolor=#fefefe
| 456639 ||  || — || August 9, 2007 || Socorro || LINEAR || MAS || align=right data-sort-value="0.78" | 780 m || 
|-id=640 bgcolor=#fefefe
| 456640 ||  || — || August 22, 2007 || Socorro || LINEAR || — || align=right data-sort-value="0.94" | 940 m || 
|-id=641 bgcolor=#fefefe
| 456641 ||  || — || August 22, 2007 || Socorro || LINEAR || — || align=right data-sort-value="0.68" | 680 m || 
|-id=642 bgcolor=#fefefe
| 456642 ||  || — || August 24, 2007 || Kitt Peak || Spacewatch || — || align=right data-sort-value="0.79" | 790 m || 
|-id=643 bgcolor=#d6d6d6
| 456643 ||  || — || August 23, 2007 || Kitt Peak || Spacewatch || — || align=right | 3.7 km || 
|-id=644 bgcolor=#fefefe
| 456644 ||  || — || August 24, 2007 || Kitt Peak || Spacewatch || — || align=right data-sort-value="0.74" | 740 m || 
|-id=645 bgcolor=#fefefe
| 456645 ||  || — || September 3, 2007 || Catalina || CSS || — || align=right data-sort-value="0.80" | 800 m || 
|-id=646 bgcolor=#d6d6d6
| 456646 ||  || — || September 2, 2007 || Siding Spring || K. Sárneczky, L. Kiss || — || align=right | 2.7 km || 
|-id=647 bgcolor=#fefefe
| 456647 ||  || — || September 12, 2007 || Dauban || Chante-Perdrix Obs. || — || align=right data-sort-value="0.83" | 830 m || 
|-id=648 bgcolor=#fefefe
| 456648 ||  || — || September 11, 2007 || Kitt Peak || Spacewatch || — || align=right data-sort-value="0.77" | 770 m || 
|-id=649 bgcolor=#fefefe
| 456649 ||  || — || September 12, 2007 || Dauban || Chante-Perdrix Obs. || — || align=right data-sort-value="0.82" | 820 m || 
|-id=650 bgcolor=#fefefe
| 456650 ||  || — || September 13, 2007 || Dauban || Chante-Perdrix Obs. || NYS || align=right data-sort-value="0.84" | 840 m || 
|-id=651 bgcolor=#FFC2E0
| 456651 ||  || — || September 14, 2007 || Socorro || LINEAR || AMO || align=right data-sort-value="0.77" | 770 m || 
|-id=652 bgcolor=#fefefe
| 456652 ||  || — || August 9, 2007 || Socorro || LINEAR || MAS || align=right data-sort-value="0.75" | 750 m || 
|-id=653 bgcolor=#fefefe
| 456653 ||  || — || August 10, 2007 || Kitt Peak || Spacewatch || MAS || align=right data-sort-value="0.68" | 680 m || 
|-id=654 bgcolor=#fefefe
| 456654 ||  || — || September 3, 2007 || Catalina || CSS || NYS || align=right data-sort-value="0.59" | 590 m || 
|-id=655 bgcolor=#fefefe
| 456655 ||  || — || August 21, 2007 || Anderson Mesa || LONEOS || — || align=right data-sort-value="0.71" | 710 m || 
|-id=656 bgcolor=#fefefe
| 456656 ||  || — || September 5, 2007 || Catalina || CSS || V || align=right data-sort-value="0.81" | 810 m || 
|-id=657 bgcolor=#fefefe
| 456657 ||  || — || September 5, 2007 || Catalina || CSS || (5026) || align=right data-sort-value="0.86" | 860 m || 
|-id=658 bgcolor=#fefefe
| 456658 ||  || — || September 8, 2007 || Anderson Mesa || LONEOS || MAS || align=right data-sort-value="0.80" | 800 m || 
|-id=659 bgcolor=#fefefe
| 456659 ||  || — || September 8, 2007 || Anderson Mesa || LONEOS || MAS || align=right data-sort-value="0.77" | 770 m || 
|-id=660 bgcolor=#fefefe
| 456660 ||  || — || August 11, 2007 || Socorro || LINEAR || — || align=right data-sort-value="0.80" | 800 m || 
|-id=661 bgcolor=#fefefe
| 456661 ||  || — || September 9, 2007 || Kitt Peak || Spacewatch || — || align=right data-sort-value="0.93" | 930 m || 
|-id=662 bgcolor=#fefefe
| 456662 ||  || — || September 9, 2007 || Kitt Peak || Spacewatch || — || align=right data-sort-value="0.70" | 700 m || 
|-id=663 bgcolor=#fefefe
| 456663 ||  || — || September 9, 2007 || Anderson Mesa || LONEOS || — || align=right data-sort-value="0.99" | 990 m || 
|-id=664 bgcolor=#d6d6d6
| 456664 ||  || — || September 9, 2007 || Kitt Peak || Spacewatch || — || align=right | 2.4 km || 
|-id=665 bgcolor=#fefefe
| 456665 ||  || — || September 10, 2007 || Kitt Peak || Spacewatch || — || align=right data-sort-value="0.86" | 860 m || 
|-id=666 bgcolor=#fefefe
| 456666 ||  || — || September 10, 2007 || Catalina || CSS || — || align=right data-sort-value="0.74" | 740 m || 
|-id=667 bgcolor=#fefefe
| 456667 ||  || — || August 10, 2007 || Kitt Peak || Spacewatch || — || align=right data-sort-value="0.71" | 710 m || 
|-id=668 bgcolor=#fefefe
| 456668 ||  || — || September 10, 2007 || Mount Lemmon || Mount Lemmon Survey || V || align=right data-sort-value="0.52" | 520 m || 
|-id=669 bgcolor=#fefefe
| 456669 ||  || — || September 10, 2007 || Mount Lemmon || Mount Lemmon Survey || — || align=right data-sort-value="0.59" | 590 m || 
|-id=670 bgcolor=#d6d6d6
| 456670 ||  || — || September 10, 2007 || Catalina || CSS || — || align=right | 2.8 km || 
|-id=671 bgcolor=#fefefe
| 456671 ||  || — || September 10, 2007 || Mount Lemmon || Mount Lemmon Survey || — || align=right data-sort-value="0.68" | 680 m || 
|-id=672 bgcolor=#fefefe
| 456672 ||  || — || August 24, 2007 || Kitt Peak || Spacewatch || — || align=right data-sort-value="0.62" | 620 m || 
|-id=673 bgcolor=#fefefe
| 456673 ||  || — || September 10, 2007 || Mount Lemmon || Mount Lemmon Survey || — || align=right data-sort-value="0.71" | 710 m || 
|-id=674 bgcolor=#fefefe
| 456674 ||  || — || September 10, 2007 || Kitt Peak || Spacewatch || V || align=right data-sort-value="0.59" | 590 m || 
|-id=675 bgcolor=#fefefe
| 456675 ||  || — || September 11, 2007 || Kitt Peak || Spacewatch || NYS || align=right data-sort-value="0.57" | 570 m || 
|-id=676 bgcolor=#fefefe
| 456676 ||  || — || September 11, 2007 || Mount Lemmon || Mount Lemmon Survey || — || align=right data-sort-value="0.67" | 670 m || 
|-id=677 bgcolor=#fefefe
| 456677 Yepeijian ||  ||  || September 11, 2007 || XuYi || PMO NEO || — || align=right data-sort-value="0.90" | 900 m || 
|-id=678 bgcolor=#fefefe
| 456678 ||  || — || July 18, 2007 || Mount Lemmon || Mount Lemmon Survey || — || align=right data-sort-value="0.82" | 820 m || 
|-id=679 bgcolor=#fefefe
| 456679 ||  || — || September 12, 2007 || Mount Lemmon || Mount Lemmon Survey || MAS || align=right data-sort-value="0.73" | 730 m || 
|-id=680 bgcolor=#fefefe
| 456680 ||  || — || September 11, 2007 || XuYi || PMO NEO || — || align=right data-sort-value="0.83" | 830 m || 
|-id=681 bgcolor=#fefefe
| 456681 ||  || — || September 8, 2007 || Anderson Mesa || LONEOS || — || align=right data-sort-value="0.76" | 760 m || 
|-id=682 bgcolor=#fefefe
| 456682 ||  || — || September 13, 2007 || Socorro || LINEAR || NYS || align=right data-sort-value="0.69" | 690 m || 
|-id=683 bgcolor=#d6d6d6
| 456683 ||  || — || August 13, 2007 || Socorro || LINEAR || LIX || align=right | 4.6 km || 
|-id=684 bgcolor=#d6d6d6
| 456684 ||  || — || August 24, 2007 || Kitt Peak || Spacewatch || VER || align=right | 2.9 km || 
|-id=685 bgcolor=#fefefe
| 456685 ||  || — || August 23, 2007 || Kitt Peak || Spacewatch || — || align=right data-sort-value="0.82" | 820 m || 
|-id=686 bgcolor=#fefefe
| 456686 ||  || — || September 12, 2007 || Catalina || CSS || NYS || align=right data-sort-value="0.71" | 710 m || 
|-id=687 bgcolor=#fefefe
| 456687 ||  || — || September 10, 2007 || Kitt Peak || Spacewatch || V || align=right data-sort-value="0.48" | 480 m || 
|-id=688 bgcolor=#d6d6d6
| 456688 ||  || — || September 10, 2007 || Kitt Peak || Spacewatch || — || align=right | 3.0 km || 
|-id=689 bgcolor=#fefefe
| 456689 ||  || — || September 10, 2007 || Kitt Peak || Spacewatch || — || align=right data-sort-value="0.68" | 680 m || 
|-id=690 bgcolor=#d6d6d6
| 456690 ||  || — || September 10, 2007 || Kitt Peak || Spacewatch || — || align=right | 4.1 km || 
|-id=691 bgcolor=#fefefe
| 456691 ||  || — || September 12, 2007 || Kitt Peak || Spacewatch || — || align=right data-sort-value="0.79" | 790 m || 
|-id=692 bgcolor=#fefefe
| 456692 ||  || — || September 10, 2007 || Kitt Peak || Spacewatch || — || align=right data-sort-value="0.56" | 560 m || 
|-id=693 bgcolor=#fefefe
| 456693 ||  || — || September 10, 2007 || Kitt Peak || Spacewatch || — || align=right data-sort-value="0.82" | 820 m || 
|-id=694 bgcolor=#fefefe
| 456694 ||  || — || September 10, 2007 || Kitt Peak || Spacewatch || — || align=right data-sort-value="0.65" | 650 m || 
|-id=695 bgcolor=#fefefe
| 456695 ||  || — || August 18, 2007 || XuYi || PMO NEO || — || align=right data-sort-value="0.89" | 890 m || 
|-id=696 bgcolor=#fefefe
| 456696 ||  || — || August 23, 2007 || Kitt Peak || Spacewatch || MAS || align=right data-sort-value="0.64" | 640 m || 
|-id=697 bgcolor=#fefefe
| 456697 ||  || — || September 5, 2007 || Catalina || CSS || — || align=right data-sort-value="0.88" | 880 m || 
|-id=698 bgcolor=#fefefe
| 456698 ||  || — || September 8, 2007 || Mount Lemmon || Mount Lemmon Survey || — || align=right data-sort-value="0.67" | 670 m || 
|-id=699 bgcolor=#fefefe
| 456699 ||  || — || September 12, 2007 || Catalina || CSS || (5026) || align=right | 1.8 km || 
|-id=700 bgcolor=#fefefe
| 456700 ||  || — || September 4, 2007 || Catalina || CSS || — || align=right data-sort-value="0.95" | 950 m || 
|}

456701–456800 

|-bgcolor=#FA8072
| 456701 ||  || — || September 13, 2007 || Socorro || LINEAR || — || align=right data-sort-value="0.78" | 780 m || 
|-id=702 bgcolor=#fefefe
| 456702 ||  || — || September 11, 2007 || Kitt Peak || Spacewatch || — || align=right data-sort-value="0.62" | 620 m || 
|-id=703 bgcolor=#fefefe
| 456703 ||  || — || September 11, 2007 || Kitt Peak || Spacewatch || MAS || align=right data-sort-value="0.57" | 570 m || 
|-id=704 bgcolor=#fefefe
| 456704 ||  || — || September 11, 2007 || Kitt Peak || Spacewatch || — || align=right data-sort-value="0.60" | 600 m || 
|-id=705 bgcolor=#fefefe
| 456705 ||  || — || September 13, 2007 || Kitt Peak || Spacewatch || — || align=right data-sort-value="0.94" | 940 m || 
|-id=706 bgcolor=#fefefe
| 456706 ||  || — || September 13, 2007 || Mount Lemmon || Mount Lemmon Survey || — || align=right data-sort-value="0.77" | 770 m || 
|-id=707 bgcolor=#fefefe
| 456707 ||  || — || July 18, 2007 || Mount Lemmon || Mount Lemmon Survey || — || align=right data-sort-value="0.68" | 680 m || 
|-id=708 bgcolor=#fefefe
| 456708 ||  || — || September 15, 2007 || Kitt Peak || Spacewatch || NYS || align=right data-sort-value="0.72" | 720 m || 
|-id=709 bgcolor=#fefefe
| 456709 ||  || — || September 4, 2007 || Mount Lemmon || Mount Lemmon Survey || MAS || align=right data-sort-value="0.57" | 570 m || 
|-id=710 bgcolor=#fefefe
| 456710 ||  || — || September 10, 2007 || Kitt Peak || Spacewatch || critical || align=right data-sort-value="0.59" | 590 m || 
|-id=711 bgcolor=#E9E9E9
| 456711 ||  || — || September 11, 2007 || Purple Mountain || PMO NEO || — || align=right | 1.9 km || 
|-id=712 bgcolor=#fefefe
| 456712 ||  || — || September 3, 2007 || Catalina || CSS || — || align=right data-sort-value="0.98" | 980 m || 
|-id=713 bgcolor=#fefefe
| 456713 ||  || — || September 11, 2007 || Kitt Peak || Spacewatch || (5026) || align=right data-sort-value="0.71" | 710 m || 
|-id=714 bgcolor=#fefefe
| 456714 ||  || — || September 12, 2007 || Mount Lemmon || Mount Lemmon Survey || MAS || align=right data-sort-value="0.57" | 570 m || 
|-id=715 bgcolor=#fefefe
| 456715 ||  || — || September 12, 2007 || Mount Lemmon || Mount Lemmon Survey || NYS || align=right data-sort-value="0.58" | 580 m || 
|-id=716 bgcolor=#fefefe
| 456716 ||  || — || September 13, 2007 || Mount Lemmon || Mount Lemmon Survey || — || align=right data-sort-value="0.67" | 670 m || 
|-id=717 bgcolor=#fefefe
| 456717 ||  || — || September 14, 2007 || Kitt Peak || Spacewatch || — || align=right data-sort-value="0.90" | 900 m || 
|-id=718 bgcolor=#fefefe
| 456718 ||  || — || September 10, 2007 || Kitt Peak || Spacewatch || — || align=right data-sort-value="0.68" | 680 m || 
|-id=719 bgcolor=#fefefe
| 456719 ||  || — || September 13, 2007 || Kitt Peak || Spacewatch || — || align=right data-sort-value="0.63" | 630 m || 
|-id=720 bgcolor=#fefefe
| 456720 ||  || — || September 9, 2007 || Kitt Peak || Spacewatch || (2076) || align=right data-sort-value="0.74" | 740 m || 
|-id=721 bgcolor=#fefefe
| 456721 ||  || — || September 11, 2007 || Kitt Peak || Spacewatch || MAS || align=right data-sort-value="0.67" | 670 m || 
|-id=722 bgcolor=#fefefe
| 456722 ||  || — || September 12, 2007 || Catalina || CSS || — || align=right data-sort-value="0.78" | 780 m || 
|-id=723 bgcolor=#fefefe
| 456723 ||  || — || September 15, 2007 || Kitt Peak || Spacewatch || — || align=right data-sort-value="0.74" | 740 m || 
|-id=724 bgcolor=#fefefe
| 456724 ||  || — || September 21, 2007 || Socorro || LINEAR || — || align=right data-sort-value="0.81" | 810 m || 
|-id=725 bgcolor=#d6d6d6
| 456725 ||  || — || September 11, 2007 || Kitt Peak || Spacewatch || — || align=right | 4.1 km || 
|-id=726 bgcolor=#fefefe
| 456726 ||  || — || September 18, 2007 || Kitt Peak || Spacewatch || — || align=right data-sort-value="0.71" | 710 m || 
|-id=727 bgcolor=#fefefe
| 456727 ||  || — || September 20, 2007 || Catalina || CSS || NYS || align=right data-sort-value="0.66" | 660 m || 
|-id=728 bgcolor=#fefefe
| 456728 ||  || — || September 20, 2007 || Catalina || CSS || — || align=right data-sort-value="0.82" | 820 m || 
|-id=729 bgcolor=#fefefe
| 456729 ||  || — || September 10, 2007 || Catalina || CSS || V || align=right data-sort-value="0.46" | 460 m || 
|-id=730 bgcolor=#fefefe
| 456730 ||  || — || September 19, 2007 || Socorro || LINEAR || MAS || align=right data-sort-value="0.75" | 750 m || 
|-id=731 bgcolor=#fefefe
| 456731 Uligrözinger ||  ||  || October 8, 2007 || Heidelberg || F. Hormuth || — || align=right data-sort-value="0.83" | 830 m || 
|-id=732 bgcolor=#fefefe
| 456732 ||  || — || September 9, 2007 || Mount Lemmon || Mount Lemmon Survey || — || align=right data-sort-value="0.80" | 800 m || 
|-id=733 bgcolor=#fefefe
| 456733 ||  || — || October 6, 2007 || Socorro || LINEAR || — || align=right data-sort-value="0.92" | 920 m || 
|-id=734 bgcolor=#fefefe
| 456734 ||  || — || October 6, 2007 || Socorro || LINEAR || NYS || align=right data-sort-value="0.64" | 640 m || 
|-id=735 bgcolor=#FA8072
| 456735 ||  || — || October 7, 2007 || Socorro || LINEAR || H || align=right data-sort-value="0.64" | 640 m || 
|-id=736 bgcolor=#fefefe
| 456736 ||  || — || September 14, 2007 || Mount Lemmon || Mount Lemmon Survey || — || align=right data-sort-value="0.79" | 790 m || 
|-id=737 bgcolor=#fefefe
| 456737 ||  || — || October 5, 2007 || Kitt Peak || Spacewatch || — || align=right data-sort-value="0.76" | 760 m || 
|-id=738 bgcolor=#fefefe
| 456738 ||  || — || September 25, 2007 || Mount Lemmon || Mount Lemmon Survey || — || align=right data-sort-value="0.59" | 590 m || 
|-id=739 bgcolor=#fefefe
| 456739 ||  || — || September 12, 2007 || Catalina || CSS || — || align=right data-sort-value="0.76" | 760 m || 
|-id=740 bgcolor=#fefefe
| 456740 ||  || — || September 5, 2007 || Mount Lemmon || Mount Lemmon Survey || — || align=right data-sort-value="0.97" | 970 m || 
|-id=741 bgcolor=#d6d6d6
| 456741 ||  || — || October 4, 2007 || Kitt Peak || Spacewatch || 3:2 || align=right | 3.6 km || 
|-id=742 bgcolor=#fefefe
| 456742 ||  || — || September 11, 2007 || Mount Lemmon || Mount Lemmon Survey || — || align=right data-sort-value="0.81" | 810 m || 
|-id=743 bgcolor=#fefefe
| 456743 ||  || — || October 4, 2007 || Kitt Peak || Spacewatch || MAS || align=right data-sort-value="0.65" | 650 m || 
|-id=744 bgcolor=#fefefe
| 456744 ||  || — || October 4, 2007 || Kitt Peak || Spacewatch || NYS || align=right data-sort-value="0.60" | 600 m || 
|-id=745 bgcolor=#fefefe
| 456745 ||  || — || October 6, 2007 || Kitt Peak || Spacewatch || — || align=right data-sort-value="0.82" | 820 m || 
|-id=746 bgcolor=#fefefe
| 456746 ||  || — || September 18, 2007 || Mount Lemmon || Mount Lemmon Survey || — || align=right data-sort-value="0.70" | 700 m || 
|-id=747 bgcolor=#fefefe
| 456747 ||  || — || October 7, 2007 || Kitt Peak || Spacewatch || — || align=right data-sort-value="0.88" | 880 m || 
|-id=748 bgcolor=#d6d6d6
| 456748 ||  || — || September 14, 2007 || Mount Lemmon || Mount Lemmon Survey || SYL7:4 || align=right | 4.1 km || 
|-id=749 bgcolor=#fefefe
| 456749 ||  || — || September 8, 2007 || Mount Lemmon || Mount Lemmon Survey || V || align=right data-sort-value="0.57" | 570 m || 
|-id=750 bgcolor=#fefefe
| 456750 ||  || — || October 4, 2007 || Kitt Peak || Spacewatch || — || align=right data-sort-value="0.71" | 710 m || 
|-id=751 bgcolor=#d6d6d6
| 456751 ||  || — || August 23, 2007 || Kitt Peak || Spacewatch || — || align=right | 3.7 km || 
|-id=752 bgcolor=#fefefe
| 456752 ||  || — || October 8, 2007 || Kitt Peak || Spacewatch || V || align=right data-sort-value="0.55" | 550 m || 
|-id=753 bgcolor=#fefefe
| 456753 ||  || — || October 7, 2007 || Mount Lemmon || Mount Lemmon Survey || H || align=right data-sort-value="0.58" | 580 m || 
|-id=754 bgcolor=#fefefe
| 456754 ||  || — || October 7, 2007 || Catalina || CSS || — || align=right data-sort-value="0.75" | 750 m || 
|-id=755 bgcolor=#fefefe
| 456755 ||  || — || September 5, 2007 || Mount Lemmon || Mount Lemmon Survey || NYS || align=right data-sort-value="0.62" | 620 m || 
|-id=756 bgcolor=#FA8072
| 456756 ||  || — || September 25, 2007 || Mount Lemmon || Mount Lemmon Survey || H || align=right data-sort-value="0.80" | 800 m || 
|-id=757 bgcolor=#fefefe
| 456757 ||  || — || September 10, 2007 || Kitt Peak || Spacewatch || — || align=right data-sort-value="0.90" | 900 m || 
|-id=758 bgcolor=#fefefe
| 456758 ||  || — || October 6, 2007 || Kitt Peak || Spacewatch || MAS || align=right data-sort-value="0.75" | 750 m || 
|-id=759 bgcolor=#fefefe
| 456759 ||  || — || September 12, 2007 || Mount Lemmon || Mount Lemmon Survey || — || align=right data-sort-value="0.76" | 760 m || 
|-id=760 bgcolor=#fefefe
| 456760 ||  || — || October 7, 2007 || Catalina || CSS || — || align=right data-sort-value="0.87" | 870 m || 
|-id=761 bgcolor=#d6d6d6
| 456761 ||  || — || October 8, 2007 || Mount Lemmon || Mount Lemmon Survey || — || align=right | 3.5 km || 
|-id=762 bgcolor=#fefefe
| 456762 ||  || — || October 8, 2007 || Mount Lemmon || Mount Lemmon Survey || — || align=right data-sort-value="0.80" | 800 m || 
|-id=763 bgcolor=#fefefe
| 456763 ||  || — || October 8, 2007 || Mount Lemmon || Mount Lemmon Survey || — || align=right data-sort-value="0.80" | 800 m || 
|-id=764 bgcolor=#fefefe
| 456764 ||  || — || October 8, 2007 || Mount Lemmon || Mount Lemmon Survey || — || align=right data-sort-value="0.57" | 570 m || 
|-id=765 bgcolor=#fefefe
| 456765 ||  || — || September 5, 2007 || Mount Lemmon || Mount Lemmon Survey || CLA || align=right | 1.5 km || 
|-id=766 bgcolor=#d6d6d6
| 456766 ||  || — || September 13, 2007 || Kitt Peak || Spacewatch || SHU3:2critical || align=right | 4.6 km || 
|-id=767 bgcolor=#fefefe
| 456767 ||  || — || October 8, 2007 || Anderson Mesa || LONEOS || — || align=right | 1.1 km || 
|-id=768 bgcolor=#fefefe
| 456768 ||  || — || October 6, 2007 || Kitt Peak || Spacewatch || — || align=right data-sort-value="0.52" | 520 m || 
|-id=769 bgcolor=#fefefe
| 456769 ||  || — || October 6, 2007 || Kitt Peak || Spacewatch || — || align=right data-sort-value="0.87" | 870 m || 
|-id=770 bgcolor=#fefefe
| 456770 ||  || — || October 6, 2007 || Kitt Peak || Spacewatch || MAS || align=right data-sort-value="0.71" | 710 m || 
|-id=771 bgcolor=#fefefe
| 456771 ||  || — || October 7, 2007 || Mount Lemmon || Mount Lemmon Survey || — || align=right data-sort-value="0.72" | 720 m || 
|-id=772 bgcolor=#fefefe
| 456772 ||  || — || August 13, 2007 || Socorro || LINEAR || — || align=right | 1.0 km || 
|-id=773 bgcolor=#d6d6d6
| 456773 ||  || — || October 6, 2007 || Socorro || LINEAR || — || align=right | 4.5 km || 
|-id=774 bgcolor=#fefefe
| 456774 ||  || — || September 13, 2007 || Kitt Peak || Spacewatch || — || align=right data-sort-value="0.72" | 720 m || 
|-id=775 bgcolor=#fefefe
| 456775 ||  || — || October 6, 2007 || Socorro || LINEAR || — || align=right data-sort-value="0.68" | 680 m || 
|-id=776 bgcolor=#fefefe
| 456776 ||  || — || September 25, 2007 || Mount Lemmon || Mount Lemmon Survey || NYS || align=right data-sort-value="0.72" | 720 m || 
|-id=777 bgcolor=#fefefe
| 456777 ||  || — || October 9, 2007 || Socorro || LINEAR || — || align=right data-sort-value="0.75" | 750 m || 
|-id=778 bgcolor=#fefefe
| 456778 ||  || — || September 15, 2007 || Anderson Mesa || LONEOS || — || align=right data-sort-value="0.91" | 910 m || 
|-id=779 bgcolor=#fefefe
| 456779 ||  || — || October 5, 2007 || Kitt Peak || Spacewatch || — || align=right data-sort-value="0.83" | 830 m || 
|-id=780 bgcolor=#fefefe
| 456780 ||  || — || October 7, 2007 || Catalina || CSS || — || align=right data-sort-value="0.89" | 890 m || 
|-id=781 bgcolor=#fefefe
| 456781 ||  || — || October 7, 2007 || Mount Lemmon || Mount Lemmon Survey || — || align=right data-sort-value="0.70" | 700 m || 
|-id=782 bgcolor=#fefefe
| 456782 ||  || — || October 8, 2007 || Anderson Mesa || LONEOS || NYS || align=right data-sort-value="0.61" | 610 m || 
|-id=783 bgcolor=#d6d6d6
| 456783 ||  || — || September 8, 2007 || Mount Lemmon || Mount Lemmon Survey || 7:4 || align=right | 4.8 km || 
|-id=784 bgcolor=#d6d6d6
| 456784 ||  || — || October 4, 2007 || Kitt Peak || Spacewatch || 3:2 || align=right | 3.1 km || 
|-id=785 bgcolor=#fefefe
| 456785 ||  || — || October 4, 2007 || Kitt Peak || Spacewatch || NYS || align=right data-sort-value="0.50" | 500 m || 
|-id=786 bgcolor=#fefefe
| 456786 ||  || — || September 12, 2007 || Mount Lemmon || Mount Lemmon Survey || — || align=right data-sort-value="0.79" | 790 m || 
|-id=787 bgcolor=#fefefe
| 456787 ||  || — || October 7, 2007 || Catalina || CSS || MAS || align=right data-sort-value="0.68" | 680 m || 
|-id=788 bgcolor=#fefefe
| 456788 ||  || — || September 21, 2003 || Kitt Peak || Spacewatch || — || align=right data-sort-value="0.68" | 680 m || 
|-id=789 bgcolor=#fefefe
| 456789 ||  || — || October 8, 2007 || Kitt Peak || Spacewatch || MAS || align=right data-sort-value="0.70" | 700 m || 
|-id=790 bgcolor=#fefefe
| 456790 ||  || — || October 8, 2007 || Mount Lemmon || Mount Lemmon Survey || — || align=right data-sort-value="0.65" | 650 m || 
|-id=791 bgcolor=#fefefe
| 456791 ||  || — || October 8, 2007 || Mount Lemmon || Mount Lemmon Survey || — || align=right data-sort-value="0.69" | 690 m || 
|-id=792 bgcolor=#fefefe
| 456792 ||  || — || October 8, 2007 || Mount Lemmon || Mount Lemmon Survey || — || align=right data-sort-value="0.73" | 730 m || 
|-id=793 bgcolor=#fefefe
| 456793 ||  || — || October 8, 2007 || Mount Lemmon || Mount Lemmon Survey || — || align=right data-sort-value="0.73" | 730 m || 
|-id=794 bgcolor=#fefefe
| 456794 ||  || — || September 11, 2007 || Mount Lemmon || Mount Lemmon Survey || critical || align=right data-sort-value="0.68" | 680 m || 
|-id=795 bgcolor=#fefefe
| 456795 ||  || — || October 8, 2007 || Kitt Peak || Spacewatch || MAS || align=right data-sort-value="0.71" | 710 m || 
|-id=796 bgcolor=#fefefe
| 456796 ||  || — || October 9, 2007 || Mount Lemmon || Mount Lemmon Survey || — || align=right data-sort-value="0.82" | 820 m || 
|-id=797 bgcolor=#fefefe
| 456797 ||  || — || October 10, 2007 || Mount Lemmon || Mount Lemmon Survey || — || align=right data-sort-value="0.86" | 860 m || 
|-id=798 bgcolor=#fefefe
| 456798 ||  || — || October 8, 2007 || Catalina || CSS || — || align=right | 1.1 km || 
|-id=799 bgcolor=#fefefe
| 456799 ||  || — || October 9, 2007 || Catalina || CSS || — || align=right | 1.1 km || 
|-id=800 bgcolor=#fefefe
| 456800 ||  || — || October 10, 2007 || Kitt Peak || Spacewatch || — || align=right data-sort-value="0.62" | 620 m || 
|}

456801–456900 

|-bgcolor=#fefefe
| 456801 ||  || — || October 10, 2007 || Mount Lemmon || Mount Lemmon Survey || — || align=right data-sort-value="0.74" | 740 m || 
|-id=802 bgcolor=#fefefe
| 456802 ||  || — || February 1, 2005 || Catalina || CSS || — || align=right data-sort-value="0.88" | 880 m || 
|-id=803 bgcolor=#fefefe
| 456803 ||  || — || October 5, 2007 || Kitt Peak || Spacewatch || NYS || align=right data-sort-value="0.61" | 610 m || 
|-id=804 bgcolor=#fefefe
| 456804 ||  || — || September 11, 2007 || Kitt Peak || Spacewatch || — || align=right data-sort-value="0.73" | 730 m || 
|-id=805 bgcolor=#d6d6d6
| 456805 ||  || — || October 13, 2007 || Catalina || CSS || SHU3:2 || align=right | 3.8 km || 
|-id=806 bgcolor=#fefefe
| 456806 ||  || — || October 12, 2007 || Kitt Peak || Spacewatch || NYS || align=right data-sort-value="0.63" | 630 m || 
|-id=807 bgcolor=#fefefe
| 456807 ||  || — || September 15, 2007 || Kitt Peak || Spacewatch || — || align=right data-sort-value="0.74" | 740 m || 
|-id=808 bgcolor=#fefefe
| 456808 ||  || — || October 11, 2007 || Mount Lemmon || Mount Lemmon Survey || NYS || align=right data-sort-value="0.55" | 550 m || 
|-id=809 bgcolor=#d6d6d6
| 456809 ||  || — || September 3, 2007 || Catalina || CSS || — || align=right | 3.7 km || 
|-id=810 bgcolor=#d6d6d6
| 456810 ||  || — || October 12, 2007 || Kitt Peak || Spacewatch || — || align=right | 2.6 km || 
|-id=811 bgcolor=#fefefe
| 456811 ||  || — || September 8, 2007 || Mount Lemmon || Mount Lemmon Survey || NYS || align=right data-sort-value="0.54" | 540 m || 
|-id=812 bgcolor=#fefefe
| 456812 ||  || — || April 10, 2002 || Socorro || LINEAR || — || align=right | 1.0 km || 
|-id=813 bgcolor=#fefefe
| 456813 ||  || — || October 14, 2007 || Mount Lemmon || Mount Lemmon Survey || NYS || align=right data-sort-value="0.48" | 480 m || 
|-id=814 bgcolor=#fefefe
| 456814 ||  || — || September 26, 2007 || Mount Lemmon || Mount Lemmon Survey || — || align=right data-sort-value="0.89" | 890 m || 
|-id=815 bgcolor=#d6d6d6
| 456815 ||  || — || September 13, 2007 || Mount Lemmon || Mount Lemmon Survey || 7:4 || align=right | 2.7 km || 
|-id=816 bgcolor=#fefefe
| 456816 ||  || — || September 12, 2007 || Catalina || CSS || NYS || align=right data-sort-value="0.72" | 720 m || 
|-id=817 bgcolor=#d6d6d6
| 456817 ||  || — || October 11, 2007 || Mount Lemmon || Mount Lemmon Survey || — || align=right | 3.5 km || 
|-id=818 bgcolor=#fefefe
| 456818 ||  || — || October 13, 2007 || Catalina || CSS || NYS || align=right data-sort-value="0.69" | 690 m || 
|-id=819 bgcolor=#fefefe
| 456819 ||  || — || October 15, 2007 || Lulin Observatory || LUSS || NYS || align=right data-sort-value="0.53" | 530 m || 
|-id=820 bgcolor=#fefefe
| 456820 ||  || — || October 15, 2007 || Lulin || LUSS || — || align=right data-sort-value="0.68" | 680 m || 
|-id=821 bgcolor=#fefefe
| 456821 ||  || — || October 8, 2007 || Anderson Mesa || LONEOS || — || align=right data-sort-value="0.92" | 920 m || 
|-id=822 bgcolor=#fefefe
| 456822 ||  || — || September 13, 2007 || Catalina || CSS || — || align=right data-sort-value="0.95" | 950 m || 
|-id=823 bgcolor=#fefefe
| 456823 ||  || — || September 25, 2007 || Mount Lemmon || Mount Lemmon Survey || NYS || align=right data-sort-value="0.64" | 640 m || 
|-id=824 bgcolor=#fefefe
| 456824 ||  || — || October 10, 2007 || Kitt Peak || Spacewatch || — || align=right data-sort-value="0.67" | 670 m || 
|-id=825 bgcolor=#fefefe
| 456825 ||  || — || September 14, 2007 || Catalina || CSS || — || align=right | 1.2 km || 
|-id=826 bgcolor=#C2E0FF
| 456826 ||  || — || October 3, 2007 || Apache Point || A. C. Becker, A. W. Puckett, J. Kubica || plutinocritical || align=right | 136 km || 
|-id=827 bgcolor=#fefefe
| 456827 ||  || — || October 8, 2007 || Kitt Peak || Spacewatch || — || align=right data-sort-value="0.64" | 640 m || 
|-id=828 bgcolor=#fefefe
| 456828 ||  || — || October 8, 2007 || Mount Lemmon || Mount Lemmon Survey || — || align=right data-sort-value="0.70" | 700 m || 
|-id=829 bgcolor=#fefefe
| 456829 ||  || — || October 10, 2007 || Kitt Peak || Spacewatch || — || align=right data-sort-value="0.67" | 670 m || 
|-id=830 bgcolor=#fefefe
| 456830 ||  || — || October 10, 2007 || Mount Lemmon || Mount Lemmon Survey || — || align=right data-sort-value="0.78" | 780 m || 
|-id=831 bgcolor=#fefefe
| 456831 ||  || — || October 10, 2007 || Kitt Peak || Spacewatch || NYS || align=right data-sort-value="0.60" | 600 m || 
|-id=832 bgcolor=#fefefe
| 456832 ||  || — || October 15, 2007 || Kitt Peak || Spacewatch || — || align=right data-sort-value="0.62" | 620 m || 
|-id=833 bgcolor=#fefefe
| 456833 ||  || — || October 9, 2007 || Mount Lemmon || Mount Lemmon Survey || CLA || align=right | 1.5 km || 
|-id=834 bgcolor=#E9E9E9
| 456834 ||  || — || October 12, 2007 || Mount Lemmon || Mount Lemmon Survey || — || align=right | 1.0 km || 
|-id=835 bgcolor=#fefefe
| 456835 ||  || — || October 9, 2007 || Socorro || LINEAR || — || align=right data-sort-value="0.78" | 780 m || 
|-id=836 bgcolor=#fefefe
| 456836 ||  || — || October 8, 2007 || Catalina || CSS || — || align=right data-sort-value="0.91" | 910 m || 
|-id=837 bgcolor=#fefefe
| 456837 ||  || — || October 9, 2007 || Kitt Peak || Spacewatch || NYS || align=right data-sort-value="0.63" | 630 m || 
|-id=838 bgcolor=#fefefe
| 456838 ||  || — || October 9, 2007 || Socorro || LINEAR || NYS || align=right data-sort-value="0.61" | 610 m || 
|-id=839 bgcolor=#fefefe
| 456839 ||  || — || October 8, 2007 || XuYi || PMO NEO || — || align=right | 1.00 km || 
|-id=840 bgcolor=#fefefe
| 456840 ||  || — || October 7, 2007 || Mount Lemmon || Mount Lemmon Survey || V || align=right data-sort-value="0.58" | 580 m || 
|-id=841 bgcolor=#fefefe
| 456841 ||  || — || October 16, 2007 || Kitt Peak || Spacewatch || NYS || align=right data-sort-value="0.59" | 590 m || 
|-id=842 bgcolor=#fefefe
| 456842 ||  || — || October 12, 2007 || Kitt Peak || Spacewatch || MAS || align=right data-sort-value="0.64" | 640 m || 
|-id=843 bgcolor=#fefefe
| 456843 ||  || — || October 6, 2007 || Kitt Peak || Spacewatch || NYS || align=right data-sort-value="0.59" | 590 m || 
|-id=844 bgcolor=#E9E9E9
| 456844 ||  || — || October 24, 2007 || Mount Lemmon || Mount Lemmon Survey || — || align=right data-sort-value="0.67" | 670 m || 
|-id=845 bgcolor=#fefefe
| 456845 ||  || — || October 30, 2007 || Kitt Peak || Spacewatch || — || align=right data-sort-value="0.65" | 650 m || 
|-id=846 bgcolor=#fefefe
| 456846 ||  || — || October 11, 2007 || Kitt Peak || Spacewatch || (2076) || align=right data-sort-value="0.72" | 720 m || 
|-id=847 bgcolor=#fefefe
| 456847 ||  || — || October 30, 2007 || Kitt Peak || Spacewatch || — || align=right data-sort-value="0.74" | 740 m || 
|-id=848 bgcolor=#fefefe
| 456848 ||  || — || October 30, 2007 || Kitt Peak || Spacewatch || — || align=right data-sort-value="0.72" | 720 m || 
|-id=849 bgcolor=#fefefe
| 456849 ||  || — || October 8, 2007 || Mount Lemmon || Mount Lemmon Survey || — || align=right data-sort-value="0.62" | 620 m || 
|-id=850 bgcolor=#fefefe
| 456850 ||  || — || October 30, 2007 || Kitt Peak || Spacewatch || V || align=right data-sort-value="0.55" | 550 m || 
|-id=851 bgcolor=#fefefe
| 456851 ||  || — || October 16, 2007 || Mount Lemmon || Mount Lemmon Survey || — || align=right data-sort-value="0.73" | 730 m || 
|-id=852 bgcolor=#fefefe
| 456852 ||  || — || October 31, 2007 || Kitt Peak || Spacewatch || MAS || align=right data-sort-value="0.61" | 610 m || 
|-id=853 bgcolor=#fefefe
| 456853 ||  || — || October 31, 2007 || Kitt Peak || Spacewatch || — || align=right data-sort-value="0.72" | 720 m || 
|-id=854 bgcolor=#fefefe
| 456854 ||  || — || September 12, 2007 || Mount Lemmon || Mount Lemmon Survey || V || align=right data-sort-value="0.65" | 650 m || 
|-id=855 bgcolor=#fefefe
| 456855 ||  || — || October 31, 2007 || Mount Lemmon || Mount Lemmon Survey || — || align=right data-sort-value="0.77" | 770 m || 
|-id=856 bgcolor=#fefefe
| 456856 ||  || — || October 20, 2007 || Mount Lemmon || Mount Lemmon Survey || — || align=right data-sort-value="0.65" | 650 m || 
|-id=857 bgcolor=#fefefe
| 456857 ||  || — || October 24, 2007 || Mount Lemmon || Mount Lemmon Survey || — || align=right data-sort-value="0.77" | 770 m || 
|-id=858 bgcolor=#fefefe
| 456858 ||  || — || October 16, 2007 || Catalina || CSS || V || align=right data-sort-value="0.57" | 570 m || 
|-id=859 bgcolor=#E9E9E9
| 456859 ||  || — || October 17, 2007 || Mount Lemmon || Mount Lemmon Survey || BRG || align=right | 1.2 km || 
|-id=860 bgcolor=#fefefe
| 456860 ||  || — || October 25, 2007 || Mount Lemmon || Mount Lemmon Survey || — || align=right | 1.0 km || 
|-id=861 bgcolor=#fefefe
| 456861 ||  || — || October 21, 2007 || Kitt Peak || Spacewatch || — || align=right data-sort-value="0.79" | 790 m || 
|-id=862 bgcolor=#fefefe
| 456862 ||  || — || September 20, 2007 || Catalina || CSS || — || align=right data-sort-value="0.93" | 930 m || 
|-id=863 bgcolor=#FFC2E0
| 456863 ||  || — || November 4, 2007 || Catalina || CSS || AMOcritical || align=right data-sort-value="0.45" | 450 m || 
|-id=864 bgcolor=#fefefe
| 456864 ||  || — || November 2, 2007 || Mount Lemmon || Mount Lemmon Survey || — || align=right | 2.1 km || 
|-id=865 bgcolor=#fefefe
| 456865 ||  || — || October 10, 2007 || Anderson Mesa || LONEOS || — || align=right | 1.2 km || 
|-id=866 bgcolor=#fefefe
| 456866 ||  || — || September 8, 2007 || Mount Lemmon || Mount Lemmon Survey || MAS || align=right data-sort-value="0.62" | 620 m || 
|-id=867 bgcolor=#fefefe
| 456867 ||  || — || October 8, 2007 || Mount Lemmon || Mount Lemmon Survey || MAS || align=right data-sort-value="0.68" | 680 m || 
|-id=868 bgcolor=#d6d6d6
| 456868 ||  || — || October 16, 2007 || Mount Lemmon || Mount Lemmon Survey || — || align=right | 3.4 km || 
|-id=869 bgcolor=#fefefe
| 456869 ||  || — || September 13, 2007 || Mount Lemmon || Mount Lemmon Survey || — || align=right data-sort-value="0.71" | 710 m || 
|-id=870 bgcolor=#E9E9E9
| 456870 ||  || — || November 3, 2007 || Mount Lemmon || Mount Lemmon Survey || — || align=right | 1.1 km || 
|-id=871 bgcolor=#fefefe
| 456871 ||  || — || November 1, 2007 || Kitt Peak || Spacewatch || — || align=right data-sort-value="0.94" | 940 m || 
|-id=872 bgcolor=#fefefe
| 456872 ||  || — || November 1, 2007 || Kitt Peak || Spacewatch || V || align=right data-sort-value="0.73" | 730 m || 
|-id=873 bgcolor=#fefefe
| 456873 ||  || — || November 1, 2007 || Kitt Peak || Spacewatch || — || align=right data-sort-value="0.63" | 630 m || 
|-id=874 bgcolor=#fefefe
| 456874 ||  || — || November 3, 2007 || Mount Lemmon || Mount Lemmon Survey || NYS || align=right data-sort-value="0.62" | 620 m || 
|-id=875 bgcolor=#fefefe
| 456875 ||  || — || September 15, 2007 || Mount Lemmon || Mount Lemmon Survey || — || align=right data-sort-value="0.71" | 710 m || 
|-id=876 bgcolor=#fefefe
| 456876 ||  || — || November 3, 2007 || Kitt Peak || Spacewatch || — || align=right data-sort-value="0.94" | 940 m || 
|-id=877 bgcolor=#fefefe
| 456877 ||  || — || November 7, 2007 || Eskridge || G. Hug || NYS || align=right data-sort-value="0.43" | 430 m || 
|-id=878 bgcolor=#fefefe
| 456878 ||  || — || November 2, 2007 || Socorro || LINEAR || — || align=right data-sort-value="0.80" | 800 m || 
|-id=879 bgcolor=#fefefe
| 456879 ||  || — || October 16, 2007 || Mount Lemmon || Mount Lemmon Survey || — || align=right data-sort-value="0.71" | 710 m || 
|-id=880 bgcolor=#fefefe
| 456880 ||  || — || November 2, 2007 || Kitt Peak || Spacewatch || H || align=right data-sort-value="0.71" | 710 m || 
|-id=881 bgcolor=#fefefe
| 456881 ||  || — || November 3, 2007 || Kitt Peak || Spacewatch || — || align=right data-sort-value="0.78" | 780 m || 
|-id=882 bgcolor=#fefefe
| 456882 ||  || — || November 3, 2007 || Kitt Peak || Spacewatch || — || align=right data-sort-value="0.92" | 920 m || 
|-id=883 bgcolor=#fefefe
| 456883 ||  || — || November 3, 2007 || Kitt Peak || Spacewatch || MAS || align=right data-sort-value="0.54" | 540 m || 
|-id=884 bgcolor=#fefefe
| 456884 ||  || — || November 3, 2007 || Kitt Peak || Spacewatch || MAS || align=right data-sort-value="0.60" | 600 m || 
|-id=885 bgcolor=#fefefe
| 456885 ||  || — || November 3, 2007 || Kitt Peak || Spacewatch || NYS || align=right data-sort-value="0.51" | 510 m || 
|-id=886 bgcolor=#fefefe
| 456886 ||  || — || November 5, 2007 || Kitt Peak || Spacewatch || — || align=right data-sort-value="0.81" | 810 m || 
|-id=887 bgcolor=#fefefe
| 456887 ||  || — || February 2, 2005 || Kitt Peak || Spacewatch || NYS || align=right data-sort-value="0.71" | 710 m || 
|-id=888 bgcolor=#fefefe
| 456888 ||  || — || September 13, 2007 || Mount Lemmon || Mount Lemmon Survey || MAS || align=right data-sort-value="0.57" | 570 m || 
|-id=889 bgcolor=#fefefe
| 456889 ||  || — || October 19, 2007 || Catalina || CSS || — || align=right data-sort-value="0.89" | 890 m || 
|-id=890 bgcolor=#fefefe
| 456890 ||  || — || November 1, 2007 || Kitt Peak || Spacewatch || MAS || align=right data-sort-value="0.54" | 540 m || 
|-id=891 bgcolor=#fefefe
| 456891 ||  || — || November 4, 2007 || Kitt Peak || Spacewatch || — || align=right data-sort-value="0.61" | 610 m || 
|-id=892 bgcolor=#E9E9E9
| 456892 ||  || — || November 4, 2007 || Kitt Peak || Spacewatch || — || align=right | 2.9 km || 
|-id=893 bgcolor=#fefefe
| 456893 ||  || — || October 20, 2007 || Mount Lemmon || Mount Lemmon Survey || — || align=right data-sort-value="0.64" | 640 m || 
|-id=894 bgcolor=#E9E9E9
| 456894 ||  || — || November 5, 2007 || Kitt Peak || Spacewatch || — || align=right data-sort-value="0.82" | 820 m || 
|-id=895 bgcolor=#fefefe
| 456895 ||  || — || October 8, 2007 || Mount Lemmon || Mount Lemmon Survey || — || align=right data-sort-value="0.71" | 710 m || 
|-id=896 bgcolor=#fefefe
| 456896 ||  || — || November 7, 2007 || Mount Lemmon || Mount Lemmon Survey || — || align=right data-sort-value="0.71" | 710 m || 
|-id=897 bgcolor=#fefefe
| 456897 ||  || — || September 9, 2007 || Mount Lemmon || Mount Lemmon Survey || MAS || align=right data-sort-value="0.62" | 620 m || 
|-id=898 bgcolor=#FFC2E0
| 456898 ||  || — || November 11, 2007 || Siding Spring || SSS || APO +1km || align=right | 1.2 km || 
|-id=899 bgcolor=#fefefe
| 456899 ||  || — || November 5, 2007 || XuYi || PMO NEO || — || align=right data-sort-value="0.87" | 870 m || 
|-id=900 bgcolor=#d6d6d6
| 456900 ||  || — || October 23, 2001 || Kitt Peak || Spacewatch || — || align=right | 4.1 km || 
|}

456901–457000 

|-bgcolor=#fefefe
| 456901 ||  || — || November 9, 2007 || Mount Lemmon || Mount Lemmon Survey || — || align=right data-sort-value="0.75" | 750 m || 
|-id=902 bgcolor=#fefefe
| 456902 ||  || — || October 21, 2007 || Kitt Peak || Spacewatch || — || align=right data-sort-value="0.74" | 740 m || 
|-id=903 bgcolor=#fefefe
| 456903 ||  || — || November 9, 2007 || Kitt Peak || Spacewatch || — || align=right data-sort-value="0.65" | 650 m || 
|-id=904 bgcolor=#fefefe
| 456904 ||  || — || November 7, 2007 || Mount Lemmon || Mount Lemmon Survey || — || align=right data-sort-value="0.84" | 840 m || 
|-id=905 bgcolor=#fefefe
| 456905 ||  || — || October 10, 2007 || Kitt Peak || Spacewatch || MAS || align=right data-sort-value="0.62" | 620 m || 
|-id=906 bgcolor=#fefefe
| 456906 ||  || — || October 30, 2007 || Kitt Peak || Spacewatch || — || align=right data-sort-value="0.78" | 780 m || 
|-id=907 bgcolor=#fefefe
| 456907 ||  || — || November 14, 2007 || Kitt Peak || Spacewatch || — || align=right data-sort-value="0.62" | 620 m || 
|-id=908 bgcolor=#E9E9E9
| 456908 ||  || — || November 14, 2007 || Kitt Peak || Spacewatch || — || align=right | 1.0 km || 
|-id=909 bgcolor=#fefefe
| 456909 ||  || — || November 8, 2007 || Kitt Peak || Spacewatch || — || align=right data-sort-value="0.61" | 610 m || 
|-id=910 bgcolor=#E9E9E9
| 456910 ||  || — || November 2, 2007 || Kitt Peak || Spacewatch || (5) || align=right data-sort-value="0.69" | 690 m || 
|-id=911 bgcolor=#fefefe
| 456911 ||  || — || November 7, 2007 || Socorro || LINEAR || — || align=right data-sort-value="0.62" | 620 m || 
|-id=912 bgcolor=#E9E9E9
| 456912 ||  || — || November 14, 2007 || Mount Lemmon || Mount Lemmon Survey || — || align=right | 1.1 km || 
|-id=913 bgcolor=#fefefe
| 456913 ||  || — || November 18, 2007 || Mount Lemmon || Mount Lemmon Survey || — || align=right | 1.1 km || 
|-id=914 bgcolor=#fefefe
| 456914 ||  || — || November 12, 2007 || Mount Lemmon || Mount Lemmon Survey || — || align=right data-sort-value="0.94" | 940 m || 
|-id=915 bgcolor=#fefefe
| 456915 ||  || — || November 17, 2007 || Kitt Peak || Spacewatch || MAS || align=right data-sort-value="0.54" | 540 m || 
|-id=916 bgcolor=#FA8072
| 456916 ||  || — || November 19, 2007 || Kitt Peak || Spacewatch || H || align=right data-sort-value="0.80" | 800 m || 
|-id=917 bgcolor=#fefefe
| 456917 ||  || — || November 13, 2007 || Kitt Peak || Spacewatch || — || align=right data-sort-value="0.77" | 770 m || 
|-id=918 bgcolor=#fefefe
| 456918 ||  || — || December 15, 2007 || Mount Lemmon || Mount Lemmon Survey || — || align=right data-sort-value="0.73" | 730 m || 
|-id=919 bgcolor=#fefefe
| 456919 ||  || — || September 14, 2007 || Mount Lemmon || Mount Lemmon Survey || NYS || align=right data-sort-value="0.55" | 550 m || 
|-id=920 bgcolor=#fefefe
| 456920 ||  || — || December 15, 2007 || Kitt Peak || Spacewatch || — || align=right data-sort-value="0.81" | 810 m || 
|-id=921 bgcolor=#fefefe
| 456921 ||  || — || December 1, 2003 || Kitt Peak || Spacewatch || — || align=right data-sort-value="0.61" | 610 m || 
|-id=922 bgcolor=#E9E9E9
| 456922 ||  || — || December 4, 2007 || Kitt Peak || Spacewatch || — || align=right | 1.2 km || 
|-id=923 bgcolor=#fefefe
| 456923 ||  || — || November 6, 2007 || Mount Lemmon || Mount Lemmon Survey || — || align=right | 1.1 km || 
|-id=924 bgcolor=#d6d6d6
| 456924 ||  || — || December 4, 2007 || Catalina || CSS || — || align=right | 4.0 km || 
|-id=925 bgcolor=#E9E9E9
| 456925 ||  || — || December 4, 2007 || Mount Lemmon || Mount Lemmon Survey || — || align=right | 1.3 km || 
|-id=926 bgcolor=#fefefe
| 456926 ||  || — || December 6, 2007 || Kitt Peak || Spacewatch || — || align=right data-sort-value="0.77" | 770 m || 
|-id=927 bgcolor=#E9E9E9
| 456927 ||  || — || December 4, 2007 || Kitt Peak || Spacewatch || (5) || align=right data-sort-value="0.69" | 690 m || 
|-id=928 bgcolor=#fefefe
| 456928 ||  || — || December 15, 2007 || Kitt Peak || Spacewatch || — || align=right data-sort-value="0.93" | 930 m || 
|-id=929 bgcolor=#E9E9E9
| 456929 ||  || — || December 5, 2007 || Kitt Peak || Spacewatch || — || align=right | 1.2 km || 
|-id=930 bgcolor=#fefefe
| 456930 ||  || — || December 6, 2007 || Socorro || LINEAR || H || align=right data-sort-value="0.80" | 800 m || 
|-id=931 bgcolor=#fefefe
| 456931 ||  || — || December 16, 2007 || Kitt Peak || Spacewatch || MAS || align=right data-sort-value="0.49" | 490 m || 
|-id=932 bgcolor=#E9E9E9
| 456932 ||  || — || November 18, 2007 || Kitt Peak || Spacewatch || — || align=right data-sort-value="0.86" | 860 m || 
|-id=933 bgcolor=#fefefe
| 456933 ||  || — || December 30, 2007 || Catalina || CSS || H || align=right data-sort-value="0.54" | 540 m || 
|-id=934 bgcolor=#E9E9E9
| 456934 ||  || — || December 30, 2007 || Kitt Peak || Spacewatch || — || align=right data-sort-value="0.73" | 730 m || 
|-id=935 bgcolor=#E9E9E9
| 456935 ||  || — || December 30, 2007 || Kitt Peak || Spacewatch || — || align=right data-sort-value="0.86" | 860 m || 
|-id=936 bgcolor=#fefefe
| 456936 ||  || — || December 30, 2007 || Kitt Peak || Spacewatch || — || align=right data-sort-value="0.74" | 740 m || 
|-id=937 bgcolor=#fefefe
| 456937 ||  || — || October 12, 2007 || Anderson Mesa || LONEOS || — || align=right | 1.1 km || 
|-id=938 bgcolor=#FFC2E0
| 456938 ||  || — || December 31, 2007 || Catalina || CSS || APOPHA || align=right data-sort-value="0.22" | 220 m || 
|-id=939 bgcolor=#E9E9E9
| 456939 ||  || — || April 4, 2005 || Mount Lemmon || Mount Lemmon Survey || (5) || align=right | 1.0 km || 
|-id=940 bgcolor=#E9E9E9
| 456940 ||  || — || December 18, 2007 || Mount Lemmon || Mount Lemmon Survey || — || align=right | 1.00 km || 
|-id=941 bgcolor=#E9E9E9
| 456941 ||  || — || December 31, 2007 || Mount Lemmon || Mount Lemmon Survey || — || align=right | 1.9 km || 
|-id=942 bgcolor=#E9E9E9
| 456942 ||  || — || September 18, 2007 || Mount Lemmon || Mount Lemmon Survey || — || align=right | 1.0 km || 
|-id=943 bgcolor=#fefefe
| 456943 ||  || — || January 10, 2008 || Kitt Peak || Spacewatch || — || align=right data-sort-value="0.88" | 880 m || 
|-id=944 bgcolor=#E9E9E9
| 456944 ||  || — || January 10, 2008 || Mount Lemmon || Mount Lemmon Survey || — || align=right data-sort-value="0.75" | 750 m || 
|-id=945 bgcolor=#fefefe
| 456945 ||  || — || December 4, 2007 || Kitt Peak || Spacewatch || — || align=right data-sort-value="0.89" | 890 m || 
|-id=946 bgcolor=#FFC2E0
| 456946 ||  || — || January 13, 2008 || Catalina || CSS || AMO || align=right data-sort-value="0.20" | 200 m || 
|-id=947 bgcolor=#E9E9E9
| 456947 ||  || — || January 10, 2008 || Mount Lemmon || Mount Lemmon Survey || — || align=right data-sort-value="0.93" | 930 m || 
|-id=948 bgcolor=#E9E9E9
| 456948 ||  || — || January 11, 2008 || Kitt Peak || Spacewatch || (5) || align=right data-sort-value="0.65" | 650 m || 
|-id=949 bgcolor=#E9E9E9
| 456949 ||  || — || January 11, 2008 || Kitt Peak || Spacewatch || — || align=right data-sort-value="0.79" | 790 m || 
|-id=950 bgcolor=#E9E9E9
| 456950 ||  || — || December 30, 2007 || Kitt Peak || Spacewatch || — || align=right data-sort-value="0.79" | 790 m || 
|-id=951 bgcolor=#E9E9E9
| 456951 ||  || — || January 11, 2008 || Kitt Peak || Spacewatch || — || align=right | 1.6 km || 
|-id=952 bgcolor=#E9E9E9
| 456952 ||  || — || January 11, 2008 || Kitt Peak || Spacewatch || — || align=right data-sort-value="0.87" | 870 m || 
|-id=953 bgcolor=#fefefe
| 456953 ||  || — || January 11, 2008 || Kitt Peak || Spacewatch || — || align=right data-sort-value="0.88" | 880 m || 
|-id=954 bgcolor=#E9E9E9
| 456954 ||  || — || January 11, 2008 || Kitt Peak || Spacewatch || critical || align=right data-sort-value="0.82" | 820 m || 
|-id=955 bgcolor=#E9E9E9
| 456955 ||  || — || January 11, 2008 || Kitt Peak || Spacewatch || — || align=right data-sort-value="0.82" | 820 m || 
|-id=956 bgcolor=#fefefe
| 456956 ||  || — || December 30, 2007 || Kitt Peak || Spacewatch || — || align=right data-sort-value="0.87" | 870 m || 
|-id=957 bgcolor=#fefefe
| 456957 ||  || — || January 11, 2008 || Kitt Peak || Spacewatch || — || align=right data-sort-value="0.78" | 780 m || 
|-id=958 bgcolor=#E9E9E9
| 456958 ||  || — || January 11, 2008 || Mount Lemmon || Mount Lemmon Survey || — || align=right data-sort-value="0.76" | 760 m || 
|-id=959 bgcolor=#E9E9E9
| 456959 ||  || — || December 30, 2007 || Mount Lemmon || Mount Lemmon Survey || — || align=right data-sort-value="0.59" | 590 m || 
|-id=960 bgcolor=#E9E9E9
| 456960 ||  || — || January 12, 2008 || Mount Lemmon || Mount Lemmon Survey || — || align=right | 1.2 km || 
|-id=961 bgcolor=#fefefe
| 456961 ||  || — || January 12, 2008 || Kitt Peak || Spacewatch || H || align=right data-sort-value="0.63" | 630 m || 
|-id=962 bgcolor=#E9E9E9
| 456962 ||  || — || January 15, 2008 || Mount Lemmon || Mount Lemmon Survey || — || align=right data-sort-value="0.96" | 960 m || 
|-id=963 bgcolor=#FA8072
| 456963 ||  || — || January 12, 2008 || Andrushivka || Andrushivka Obs. || H || align=right data-sort-value="0.69" | 690 m || 
|-id=964 bgcolor=#fefefe
| 456964 ||  || — || December 30, 2007 || Kitt Peak || Spacewatch || — || align=right data-sort-value="0.64" | 640 m || 
|-id=965 bgcolor=#fefefe
| 456965 ||  || — || January 1, 2008 || Kitt Peak || Spacewatch || — || align=right | 1.1 km || 
|-id=966 bgcolor=#E9E9E9
| 456966 ||  || — || December 30, 2007 || Kitt Peak || Spacewatch || — || align=right | 1.3 km || 
|-id=967 bgcolor=#d6d6d6
| 456967 ||  || — || January 14, 2008 || Kitt Peak || Spacewatch || 3:2 || align=right | 5.0 km || 
|-id=968 bgcolor=#fefefe
| 456968 ||  || — || January 14, 2008 || Kitt Peak || Spacewatch || — || align=right data-sort-value="0.95" | 950 m || 
|-id=969 bgcolor=#fefefe
| 456969 ||  || — || December 20, 2007 || Kitt Peak || Spacewatch || — || align=right data-sort-value="0.76" | 760 m || 
|-id=970 bgcolor=#fefefe
| 456970 ||  || — || December 31, 2007 || Kitt Peak || Spacewatch || — || align=right data-sort-value="0.76" | 760 m || 
|-id=971 bgcolor=#fefefe
| 456971 ||  || — || December 17, 2007 || Catalina || CSS || H || align=right data-sort-value="0.80" | 800 m || 
|-id=972 bgcolor=#fefefe
| 456972 ||  || — || January 13, 2008 || Kitt Peak || Spacewatch || — || align=right data-sort-value="0.84" | 840 m || 
|-id=973 bgcolor=#FFC2E0
| 456973 ||  || — || January 18, 2008 || Kitt Peak || Spacewatch || APO +1km || align=right data-sort-value="0.83" | 830 m || 
|-id=974 bgcolor=#E9E9E9
| 456974 ||  || — || December 31, 2007 || Mount Lemmon || Mount Lemmon Survey || — || align=right data-sort-value="0.74" | 740 m || 
|-id=975 bgcolor=#fefefe
| 456975 ||  || — || December 20, 2007 || Kitt Peak || Spacewatch || — || align=right data-sort-value="0.91" | 910 m || 
|-id=976 bgcolor=#fefefe
| 456976 ||  || — || January 30, 2008 || Kitt Peak || Spacewatch || MAS || align=right data-sort-value="0.71" | 710 m || 
|-id=977 bgcolor=#E9E9E9
| 456977 ||  || — || January 30, 2008 || Mount Lemmon || Mount Lemmon Survey || — || align=right data-sort-value="0.85" | 850 m || 
|-id=978 bgcolor=#E9E9E9
| 456978 ||  || — || January 15, 2008 || Mount Lemmon || Mount Lemmon Survey || — || align=right data-sort-value="0.90" | 900 m || 
|-id=979 bgcolor=#E9E9E9
| 456979 ||  || — || January 30, 2008 || Mount Lemmon || Mount Lemmon Survey || — || align=right data-sort-value="0.83" | 830 m || 
|-id=980 bgcolor=#E9E9E9
| 456980 ||  || — || November 19, 2007 || Mount Lemmon || Mount Lemmon Survey || — || align=right data-sort-value="0.74" | 740 m || 
|-id=981 bgcolor=#E9E9E9
| 456981 ||  || — || January 30, 2008 || Kitt Peak || Spacewatch || — || align=right data-sort-value="0.72" | 720 m || 
|-id=982 bgcolor=#E9E9E9
| 456982 ||  || — || January 30, 2008 || Kitt Peak || Spacewatch || — || align=right data-sort-value="0.89" | 890 m || 
|-id=983 bgcolor=#E9E9E9
| 456983 ||  || — || September 19, 2006 || Catalina || CSS || — || align=right | 1.6 km || 
|-id=984 bgcolor=#fefefe
| 456984 ||  || — || January 30, 2008 || Mount Lemmon || Mount Lemmon Survey || H || align=right data-sort-value="0.81" | 810 m || 
|-id=985 bgcolor=#fefefe
| 456985 ||  || — || December 14, 2007 || Catalina || CSS || — || align=right data-sort-value="0.94" | 940 m || 
|-id=986 bgcolor=#E9E9E9
| 456986 ||  || — || February 1, 2008 || Kitt Peak || Spacewatch || — || align=right | 1.5 km || 
|-id=987 bgcolor=#E9E9E9
| 456987 ||  || — || February 2, 2008 || Mount Lemmon || Mount Lemmon Survey || — || align=right data-sort-value="0.87" | 870 m || 
|-id=988 bgcolor=#E9E9E9
| 456988 ||  || — || February 3, 2008 || Kitt Peak || Spacewatch || — || align=right | 1.1 km || 
|-id=989 bgcolor=#E9E9E9
| 456989 ||  || — || February 3, 2008 || Kitt Peak || Spacewatch || — || align=right | 1.2 km || 
|-id=990 bgcolor=#E9E9E9
| 456990 ||  || — || January 10, 2008 || Mount Lemmon || Mount Lemmon Survey || — || align=right data-sort-value="0.98" | 980 m || 
|-id=991 bgcolor=#E9E9E9
| 456991 ||  || — || February 2, 2008 || Kitt Peak || Spacewatch || — || align=right | 1.5 km || 
|-id=992 bgcolor=#E9E9E9
| 456992 ||  || — || February 2, 2008 || Kitt Peak || Spacewatch || — || align=right data-sort-value="0.81" | 810 m || 
|-id=993 bgcolor=#E9E9E9
| 456993 ||  || — || January 1, 2008 || Mount Lemmon || Mount Lemmon Survey || — || align=right | 1.2 km || 
|-id=994 bgcolor=#E9E9E9
| 456994 ||  || — || February 2, 2008 || Kitt Peak || Spacewatch || — || align=right data-sort-value="0.83" | 830 m || 
|-id=995 bgcolor=#E9E9E9
| 456995 ||  || — || January 11, 2008 || Mount Lemmon || Mount Lemmon Survey || — || align=right data-sort-value="0.86" | 860 m || 
|-id=996 bgcolor=#E9E9E9
| 456996 ||  || — || February 2, 2008 || Kitt Peak || Spacewatch || — || align=right data-sort-value="0.84" | 840 m || 
|-id=997 bgcolor=#fefefe
| 456997 ||  || — || December 18, 2007 || Mount Lemmon || Mount Lemmon Survey || H || align=right data-sort-value="0.69" | 690 m || 
|-id=998 bgcolor=#fefefe
| 456998 ||  || — || February 6, 2008 || Catalina || CSS || H || align=right data-sort-value="0.81" | 810 m || 
|-id=999 bgcolor=#E9E9E9
| 456999 ||  || — || February 6, 2008 || Catalina || CSS || — || align=right data-sort-value="0.90" | 900 m || 
|-id=000 bgcolor=#E9E9E9
| 457000 ||  || — || February 7, 2008 || Kitt Peak || Spacewatch || — || align=right data-sort-value="0.71" | 710 m || 
|}

References

External links 
 Discovery Circumstances: Numbered Minor Planets (455001)–(460000) (IAU Minor Planet Center)

0456